

19001–19100 

|-bgcolor=#E9E9E9
| 19001 ||  || — || September 6, 2000 || Socorro || LINEAR || — || align=right | 7.4 km || 
|-id=002 bgcolor=#fefefe
| 19002 Tongkexue ||  ||  || September 1, 2000 || Socorro || LINEAR || V || align=right | 2.9 km || 
|-id=003 bgcolor=#E9E9E9
| 19003 Erinfrey ||  ||  || September 1, 2000 || Socorro || LINEAR || AGN || align=right | 4.7 km || 
|-id=004 bgcolor=#fefefe
| 19004 Chirayath ||  ||  || September 2, 2000 || Socorro || LINEAR || — || align=right | 1.8 km || 
|-id=005 bgcolor=#d6d6d6
| 19005 Teckman ||  ||  || September 1, 2000 || Socorro || LINEAR || KOR || align=right | 4.7 km || 
|-id=006 bgcolor=#E9E9E9
| 19006 ||  || — || September 1, 2000 || Socorro || LINEAR || ADE || align=right | 11 km || 
|-id=007 bgcolor=#fefefe
| 19007 Nirajnathan ||  ||  || September 2, 2000 || Socorro || LINEAR || FLO || align=right | 2.4 km || 
|-id=008 bgcolor=#d6d6d6
| 19008 Kristibutler ||  ||  || September 2, 2000 || Socorro || LINEAR || KOR || align=right | 5.4 km || 
|-id=009 bgcolor=#E9E9E9
| 19009 Galenmaly ||  ||  || September 2, 2000 || Socorro || LINEAR || — || align=right | 8.8 km || 
|-id=010 bgcolor=#d6d6d6
| 19010 ||  || — || September 2, 2000 || Socorro || LINEAR || ALA || align=right | 13 km || 
|-id=011 bgcolor=#fefefe
| 19011 ||  || — || September 3, 2000 || Socorro || LINEAR || H || align=right | 2.5 km || 
|-id=012 bgcolor=#E9E9E9
| 19012 ||  || — || September 3, 2000 || Socorro || LINEAR || EUN || align=right | 4.6 km || 
|-id=013 bgcolor=#E9E9E9
| 19013 ||  || — || September 4, 2000 || Socorro || LINEAR || — || align=right | 4.8 km || 
|-id=014 bgcolor=#E9E9E9
| 19014 ||  || — || September 9, 2000 || Višnjan Observatory || K. Korlević || AGN || align=right | 4.0 km || 
|-id=015 bgcolor=#E9E9E9
| 19015 ||  || — || September 9, 2000 || Višnjan Observatory || K. Korlević || GEF || align=right | 5.8 km || 
|-id=016 bgcolor=#E9E9E9
| 19016 ||  || — || September 11, 2000 || Črni Vrh || Črni Vrh || — || align=right | 9.2 km || 
|-id=017 bgcolor=#d6d6d6
| 19017 Susanlederer ||  ||  || September 4, 2000 || Anderson Mesa || LONEOS || KOR || align=right | 3.6 km || 
|-id=018 bgcolor=#C2FFFF
| 19018 ||  || — || September 5, 2000 || Anderson Mesa || LONEOS || L5 || align=right | 32 km || 
|-id=019 bgcolor=#E9E9E9
| 19019 Sunflower || 2000 SB ||  || September 17, 2000 || Olathe || L. Robinson || — || align=right | 3.0 km || 
|-id=020 bgcolor=#C2FFFF
| 19020 ||  || — || September 20, 2000 || Socorro || LINEAR || L5 || align=right | 43 km || 
|-id=021 bgcolor=#E9E9E9
| 19021 ||  || — || September 20, 2000 || Socorro || LINEAR || Tj (2.88) || align=right | 9.2 km || 
|-id=022 bgcolor=#E9E9E9
| 19022 Penzel ||  ||  || September 26, 2000 || Drebach || G. Lehmann || — || align=right | 5.2 km || 
|-id=023 bgcolor=#E9E9E9
| 19023 Varela ||  ||  || September 24, 2000 || Socorro || LINEAR || MIS || align=right | 6.4 km || 
|-id=024 bgcolor=#d6d6d6
| 19024 ||  || — || September 24, 2000 || Socorro || LINEAR || — || align=right | 9.8 km || 
|-id=025 bgcolor=#fefefe
| 19025 Arthurpetron ||  ||  || September 24, 2000 || Socorro || LINEAR || V || align=right | 2.7 km || 
|-id=026 bgcolor=#d6d6d6
| 19026 ||  || — || September 24, 2000 || Socorro || LINEAR || — || align=right | 11 km || 
|-id=027 bgcolor=#d6d6d6
| 19027 ||  || — || September 24, 2000 || Socorro || LINEAR || EOS || align=right | 6.2 km || 
|-id=028 bgcolor=#d6d6d6
| 19028 ||  || — || September 23, 2000 || Socorro || LINEAR || — || align=right | 21 km || 
|-id=029 bgcolor=#fefefe
| 19029 Briede ||  ||  || September 24, 2000 || Socorro || LINEAR || NYS || align=right | 2.5 km || 
|-id=030 bgcolor=#d6d6d6
| 19030 ||  || — || September 30, 2000 || Socorro || LINEAR || — || align=right | 13 km || 
|-id=031 bgcolor=#E9E9E9
| 19031 ||  || — || September 27, 2000 || Socorro || LINEAR || — || align=right | 6.5 km || 
|-id=032 bgcolor=#E9E9E9
| 19032 || 2053 P-L || — || September 24, 1960 || Palomar || PLS || VIB || align=right | 8.5 km || 
|-id=033 bgcolor=#d6d6d6
| 19033 || 2157 P-L || — || September 24, 1960 || Palomar || PLS || — || align=right | 11 km || 
|-id=034 bgcolor=#d6d6d6
| 19034 Santorini || 2554 P-L ||  || September 24, 1960 || Palomar || PLS || SHU3:2slow || align=right | 20 km || 
|-id=035 bgcolor=#fefefe
| 19035 || 4634 P-L || — || September 24, 1960 || Palomar || PLS || FLO || align=right | 2.5 km || 
|-id=036 bgcolor=#fefefe
| 19036 || 4642 P-L || — || September 24, 1960 || Palomar || PLS || — || align=right | 2.0 km || 
|-id=037 bgcolor=#fefefe
| 19037 || 4663 P-L || — || September 24, 1960 || Palomar || PLS || NYS || align=right | 1.5 km || 
|-id=038 bgcolor=#d6d6d6
| 19038 || 4764 P-L || — || September 24, 1960 || Palomar || PLS || KOR || align=right | 4.8 km || 
|-id=039 bgcolor=#fefefe
| 19039 || 4844 P-L || — || September 24, 1960 || Palomar || PLS || — || align=right | 1.9 km || 
|-id=040 bgcolor=#fefefe
| 19040 || 4875 P-L || — || September 26, 1960 || Palomar || PLS || NYS || align=right | 2.6 km || 
|-id=041 bgcolor=#fefefe
| 19041 || 6055 P-L || — || September 24, 1960 || Palomar || PLS || NYS || align=right | 1.7 km || 
|-id=042 bgcolor=#d6d6d6
| 19042 || 6104 P-L || — || September 24, 1960 || Palomar || PLS || — || align=right | 9.0 km || 
|-id=043 bgcolor=#fefefe
| 19043 || 6214 P-L || — || September 24, 1960 || Palomar || PLS || — || align=right | 2.7 km || 
|-id=044 bgcolor=#fefefe
| 19044 || 6516 P-L || — || September 24, 1960 || Palomar || PLS || — || align=right | 1.8 km || 
|-id=045 bgcolor=#fefefe
| 19045 || 6593 P-L || — || September 24, 1960 || Palomar || PLS || — || align=right | 2.8 km || 
|-id=046 bgcolor=#fefefe
| 19046 || 7607 P-L || — || October 17, 1960 || Palomar || PLS || NYS || align=right | 1.9 km || 
|-id=047 bgcolor=#fefefe
| 19047 || 9516 P-L || — || October 22, 1960 || Palomar || PLS || — || align=right | 2.1 km || 
|-id=048 bgcolor=#d6d6d6
| 19048 || 9567 P-L || — || October 17, 1960 || Palomar || PLS || VER || align=right | 8.8 km || 
|-id=049 bgcolor=#E9E9E9
| 19049 || 1105 T-1 || — || March 25, 1971 || Palomar || PLS || — || align=right | 4.2 km || 
|-id=050 bgcolor=#d6d6d6
| 19050 || 1162 T-1 || — || March 25, 1971 || Palomar || PLS || — || align=right | 4.7 km || 
|-id=051 bgcolor=#fefefe
| 19051 || 3210 T-1 || — || March 26, 1971 || Palomar || PLS || — || align=right | 2.3 km || 
|-id=052 bgcolor=#d6d6d6
| 19052 || 1017 T-2 || — || September 29, 1973 || Palomar || PLS || — || align=right | 7.0 km || 
|-id=053 bgcolor=#d6d6d6
| 19053 || 1054 T-2 || — || September 29, 1973 || Palomar || PLS || — || align=right | 9.6 km || 
|-id=054 bgcolor=#d6d6d6
| 19054 || 1058 T-2 || — || September 29, 1973 || Palomar || PLS || — || align=right | 8.2 km || 
|-id=055 bgcolor=#d6d6d6
| 19055 || 1066 T-2 || — || September 29, 1973 || Palomar || PLS || — || align=right | 4.0 km || 
|-id=056 bgcolor=#E9E9E9
| 19056 || 1162 T-2 || — || September 29, 1973 || Palomar || PLS || — || align=right | 4.6 km || 
|-id=057 bgcolor=#fefefe
| 19057 || 1166 T-2 || — || September 29, 1973 || Palomar || PLS || — || align=right | 2.5 km || 
|-id=058 bgcolor=#E9E9E9
| 19058 || 1331 T-2 || — || September 29, 1973 || Palomar || PLS || HEN || align=right | 3.1 km || 
|-id=059 bgcolor=#fefefe
| 19059 || 1352 T-2 || — || September 29, 1973 || Palomar || PLS || MAS || align=right | 7.6 km || 
|-id=060 bgcolor=#E9E9E9
| 19060 || 2176 T-2 || — || September 29, 1973 || Palomar || PLS || — || align=right | 4.6 km || 
|-id=061 bgcolor=#fefefe
| 19061 || 2261 T-2 || — || September 29, 1973 || Palomar || PLS || NYS || align=right | 2.6 km || 
|-id=062 bgcolor=#d6d6d6
| 19062 || 2289 T-2 || — || September 29, 1973 || Palomar || PLS || EOS || align=right | 6.1 km || 
|-id=063 bgcolor=#d6d6d6
| 19063 || 3147 T-2 || — || September 30, 1973 || Palomar || PLS || — || align=right | 8.5 km || 
|-id=064 bgcolor=#fefefe
| 19064 || 3176 T-2 || — || September 30, 1973 || Palomar || PLS || — || align=right | 3.1 km || 
|-id=065 bgcolor=#fefefe
| 19065 || 3351 T-2 || — || September 25, 1973 || Palomar || PLS || NYS || align=right | 3.5 km || 
|-id=066 bgcolor=#E9E9E9
| 19066 Ellarie || 4068 T-2 ||  || September 29, 1973 || Palomar || PLS || — || align=right | 2.7 km || 
|-id=067 bgcolor=#d6d6d6
| 19067 || 4087 T-2 || — || September 29, 1973 || Palomar || PLS || — || align=right | 4.9 km || 
|-id=068 bgcolor=#fefefe
| 19068 || 4232 T-2 || — || September 29, 1973 || Palomar || PLS || NYS || align=right | 2.4 km || 
|-id=069 bgcolor=#d6d6d6
| 19069 || 5149 T-2 || — || September 25, 1973 || Palomar || PLS || — || align=right | 5.3 km || 
|-id=070 bgcolor=#d6d6d6
| 19070 || 5491 T-2 || — || September 30, 1973 || Palomar || PLS || — || align=right | 8.3 km || 
|-id=071 bgcolor=#E9E9E9
| 19071 || 1047 T-3 || — || October 17, 1977 || Palomar || PLS || — || align=right | 4.1 km || 
|-id=072 bgcolor=#d6d6d6
| 19072 || 1222 T-3 || — || October 17, 1977 || Palomar || PLS || — || align=right | 11 km || 
|-id=073 bgcolor=#fefefe
| 19073 || 3157 T-3 || — || October 16, 1977 || Palomar || PLS || — || align=right | 2.6 km || 
|-id=074 bgcolor=#d6d6d6
| 19074 || 4236 T-3 || — || October 16, 1977 || Palomar || PLS || HYG || align=right | 11 km || 
|-id=075 bgcolor=#E9E9E9
| 19075 || 4288 T-3 || — || October 16, 1977 || Palomar || PLS || NEM || align=right | 7.1 km || 
|-id=076 bgcolor=#E9E9E9
| 19076 || 5002 T-3 || — || October 16, 1977 || Palomar || PLS || — || align=right | 7.0 km || 
|-id=077 bgcolor=#fefefe
| 19077 || 5123 T-3 || — || October 16, 1977 || Palomar || PLS || V || align=right | 2.4 km || 
|-id=078 bgcolor=#d6d6d6
| 19078 || 5187 T-3 || — || October 16, 1977 || Palomar || PLS || — || align=right | 16 km || 
|-id=079 bgcolor=#d6d6d6
| 19079 Hernández || 1967 KC ||  || May 31, 1967 || El Leoncito || Félix Aguilar Obs. || — || align=right | 13 km || 
|-id=080 bgcolor=#FA8072
| 19080 Martínfierro || 1970 JB ||  || May 10, 1970 || El Leoncito || Félix Aguilar Obs. || PHO || align=right | 4.5 km || 
|-id=081 bgcolor=#E9E9E9
| 19081 Mravinskij ||  ||  || September 22, 1973 || Nauchnij || N. S. Chernykh || MAR || align=right | 5.8 km || 
|-id=082 bgcolor=#fefefe
| 19082 Vikchernov || 1976 QS ||  || August 26, 1976 || Nauchnij || N. S. Chernykh || — || align=right | 3.3 km || 
|-id=083 bgcolor=#d6d6d6
| 19083 Mizuki ||  ||  || February 18, 1977 || Kiso || H. Kosai, K. Furukawa || KOR || align=right | 6.8 km || 
|-id=084 bgcolor=#fefefe
| 19084 Eilestam ||  ||  || September 2, 1978 || La Silla || C.-I. Lagerkvist || V || align=right | 3.7 km || 
|-id=085 bgcolor=#fefefe
| 19085 ||  || — || October 27, 1978 || Palomar || C. M. Olmstead || NYS || align=right | 1.9 km || 
|-id=086 bgcolor=#d6d6d6
| 19086 ||  || — || November 7, 1978 || Palomar || E. F. Helin, S. J. Bus || — || align=right | 14 km || 
|-id=087 bgcolor=#d6d6d6
| 19087 ||  || — || November 7, 1978 || Palomar || E. F. Helin, S. J. Bus || THM || align=right | 9.4 km || 
|-id=088 bgcolor=#fefefe
| 19088 ||  || — || November 7, 1978 || Palomar || E. F. Helin, S. J. Bus || MAS || align=right | 1.8 km || 
|-id=089 bgcolor=#d6d6d6
| 19089 ||  || — || November 7, 1978 || Palomar || E. F. Helin, S. J. Bus || — || align=right | 6.5 km || 
|-id=090 bgcolor=#fefefe
| 19090 ||  || — || November 7, 1978 || Palomar || E. F. Helin, S. J. Bus || FLO || align=right | 2.3 km || 
|-id=091 bgcolor=#E9E9E9
| 19091 || 1978 XX || — || December 6, 1978 || Palomar || E. Bowell, A. Warnock || EUN || align=right | 6.9 km || 
|-id=092 bgcolor=#fefefe
| 19092 ||  || — || June 25, 1979 || Siding Spring || E. F. Helin, S. J. Bus || — || align=right | 2.1 km || 
|-id=093 bgcolor=#d6d6d6
| 19093 ||  || — || June 25, 1979 || Siding Spring || E. F. Helin, S. J. Bus || FIR || align=right | 11 km || 
|-id=094 bgcolor=#fefefe
| 19094 ||  || — || June 25, 1979 || Siding Spring || E. F. Helin, S. J. Bus || FLO || align=right | 1.8 km || 
|-id=095 bgcolor=#d6d6d6
| 19095 ||  || — || June 25, 1979 || Siding Spring || E. F. Helin, S. J. Bus || — || align=right | 6.7 km || 
|-id=096 bgcolor=#fefefe
| 19096 Leonfridman ||  ||  || October 14, 1979 || Nauchnij || N. S. Chernykh || — || align=right | 4.3 km || 
|-id=097 bgcolor=#d6d6d6
| 19097 ||  || — || March 2, 1981 || Siding Spring || S. J. Bus || EOS || align=right | 4.9 km || 
|-id=098 bgcolor=#fefefe
| 19098 ||  || — || March 2, 1981 || Siding Spring || S. J. Bus || V || align=right | 1.8 km || 
|-id=099 bgcolor=#E9E9E9
| 19099 ||  || — || March 2, 1981 || Siding Spring || S. J. Bus || — || align=right | 6.5 km || 
|-id=100 bgcolor=#d6d6d6
| 19100 ||  || — || March 2, 1981 || Siding Spring || S. J. Bus || — || align=right | 3.9 km || 
|}

19101–19200 

|-bgcolor=#d6d6d6
| 19101 ||  || — || March 6, 1981 || Siding Spring || S. J. Bus || EOS || align=right | 5.0 km || 
|-id=102 bgcolor=#fefefe
| 19102 ||  || — || March 1, 1981 || Siding Spring || S. J. Bus || — || align=right | 2.5 km || 
|-id=103 bgcolor=#E9E9E9
| 19103 ||  || — || March 7, 1981 || Siding Spring || S. J. Bus || — || align=right | 2.5 km || 
|-id=104 bgcolor=#d6d6d6
| 19104 ||  || — || March 1, 1981 || Siding Spring || S. J. Bus || — || align=right | 5.1 km || 
|-id=105 bgcolor=#E9E9E9
| 19105 ||  || — || March 1, 1981 || Siding Spring || S. J. Bus || — || align=right | 2.8 km || 
|-id=106 bgcolor=#E9E9E9
| 19106 ||  || — || March 1, 1981 || Siding Spring || S. J. Bus || — || align=right | 2.7 km || 
|-id=107 bgcolor=#fefefe
| 19107 ||  || — || March 2, 1981 || Siding Spring || S. J. Bus || — || align=right | 3.1 km || 
|-id=108 bgcolor=#d6d6d6
| 19108 ||  || — || March 2, 1981 || Siding Spring || S. J. Bus || — || align=right | 4.0 km || 
|-id=109 bgcolor=#E9E9E9
| 19109 ||  || — || March 7, 1981 || Siding Spring || S. J. Bus || — || align=right | 3.8 km || 
|-id=110 bgcolor=#d6d6d6
| 19110 ||  || — || March 1, 1981 || Siding Spring || S. J. Bus || HYG || align=right | 8.2 km || 
|-id=111 bgcolor=#fefefe
| 19111 ||  || — || March 1, 1981 || Siding Spring || S. J. Bus || V || align=right | 1.9 km || 
|-id=112 bgcolor=#fefefe
| 19112 ||  || — || March 2, 1981 || Siding Spring || S. J. Bus || — || align=right | 4.5 km || 
|-id=113 bgcolor=#E9E9E9
| 19113 ||  || — || March 1, 1981 || Siding Spring || S. J. Bus || — || align=right | 5.3 km || 
|-id=114 bgcolor=#E9E9E9
| 19114 ||  || — || March 1, 1981 || Siding Spring || S. J. Bus || — || align=right | 2.7 km || 
|-id=115 bgcolor=#fefefe
| 19115 ||  || — || March 2, 1981 || Siding Spring || S. J. Bus || FLO || align=right | 2.2 km || 
|-id=116 bgcolor=#fefefe
| 19116 ||  || — || March 2, 1981 || Siding Spring || S. J. Bus || FLO || align=right | 3.3 km || 
|-id=117 bgcolor=#d6d6d6
| 19117 ||  || — || March 2, 1981 || Siding Spring || S. J. Bus || — || align=right | 4.1 km || 
|-id=118 bgcolor=#fefefe
| 19118 ||  || — || September 26, 1981 || Anderson Mesa || N. G. Thomas || V || align=right | 4.6 km || 
|-id=119 bgcolor=#fefefe
| 19119 Dimpna ||  ||  || September 27, 1981 || Nauchnij || L. G. Karachkina || — || align=right | 3.9 km || 
|-id=120 bgcolor=#E9E9E9
| 19120 Doronina ||  ||  || August 6, 1983 || Nauchnij || L. G. Karachkina || — || align=right | 6.9 km || 
|-id=121 bgcolor=#d6d6d6
| 19121 ||  || — || February 12, 1985 || La Silla || H. Debehogne || — || align=right | 7.8 km || 
|-id=122 bgcolor=#fefefe
| 19122 Amandabosh ||  ||  || November 7, 1985 || Anderson Mesa || E. Bowell || NYS || align=right | 4.4 km || 
|-id=123 bgcolor=#fefefe
| 19123 Stephenlevine ||  ||  || October 7, 1986 || Anderson Mesa || E. Bowell || — || align=right | 2.6 km || 
|-id=124 bgcolor=#E9E9E9
| 19124 ||  || — || October 4, 1986 || Kleť || A. Mrkos || — || align=right | 8.6 km || 
|-id=125 bgcolor=#fefefe
| 19125 || 1987 CH || — || February 2, 1987 || La Silla || E. W. Elst || FLO || align=right | 3.1 km || 
|-id=126 bgcolor=#E9E9E9
| 19126 Ottohahn || 1987 QW ||  || August 22, 1987 || Tautenburg Observatory || F. Börngen || — || align=right | 4.1 km || 
|-id=127 bgcolor=#FA8072
| 19127 Olegefremov ||  ||  || August 26, 1987 || Nauchnij || L. G. Karachkina || — || align=right | 2.5 km || 
|-id=128 bgcolor=#E9E9E9
| 19128 ||  || — || December 17, 1987 || La Silla || E. W. Elst, G. Pizarro || — || align=right | 3.5 km || 
|-id=129 bgcolor=#E9E9E9
| 19129 Loos ||  ||  || January 10, 1988 || Kleť || A. Mrkos || — || align=right | 11 km || 
|-id=130 bgcolor=#E9E9E9
| 19130 Tytgat ||  ||  || February 11, 1988 || La Silla || E. W. Elst || — || align=right | 6.3 km || 
|-id=131 bgcolor=#E9E9E9
| 19131 ||  || — || February 13, 1988 || La Silla || E. W. Elst || GEF || align=right | 4.0 km || 
|-id=132 bgcolor=#E9E9E9
| 19132 Le Clézio ||  ||  || February 13, 1988 || La Silla || E. W. Elst || — || align=right | 8.1 km || 
|-id=133 bgcolor=#E9E9E9
| 19133 ||  || — || August 7, 1988 || Kleť || Z. Vávrová || ADE || align=right | 7.0 km || 
|-id=134 bgcolor=#fefefe
| 19134 ||  || — || October 15, 1988 || Gekko || Y. Oshima || — || align=right | 4.3 km || 
|-id=135 bgcolor=#E9E9E9
| 19135 Takashionaka || 1988 XQ ||  || December 3, 1988 || Kitami || K. Endate, K. Watanabe || — || align=right | 5.0 km || 
|-id=136 bgcolor=#E9E9E9
| 19136 Strassmann ||  ||  || January 10, 1989 || Tautenburg Observatory || F. Börngen || — || align=right | 3.9 km || 
|-id=137 bgcolor=#E9E9E9
| 19137 Copiapó ||  ||  || February 4, 1989 || La Silla || E. W. Elst || — || align=right | 4.6 km || 
|-id=138 bgcolor=#fefefe
| 19138 ||  || — || March 10, 1989 || Toyota || K. Suzuki, T. Furuta || — || align=right | 3.6 km || 
|-id=139 bgcolor=#E9E9E9
| 19139 Apian ||  ||  || April 6, 1989 || Tautenburg Observatory || F. Börngen || — || align=right | 5.6 km || 
|-id=140 bgcolor=#fefefe
| 19140 Jansmit ||  ||  || September 2, 1989 || Palomar || C. S. Shoemaker, E. M. Shoemaker || PHO || align=right | 4.0 km || 
|-id=141 bgcolor=#fefefe
| 19141 Poelkapelle ||  ||  || September 26, 1989 || La Silla || E. W. Elst || fast? || align=right | 3.0 km || 
|-id=142 bgcolor=#fefefe
| 19142 Langemarck ||  ||  || September 26, 1989 || La Silla || E. W. Elst || NYS || align=right | 2.0 km || 
|-id=143 bgcolor=#fefefe
| 19143 ||  || — || September 26, 1989 || La Silla || H. Debehogne || — || align=right | 2.4 km || 
|-id=144 bgcolor=#fefefe
| 19144 ||  || — || October 28, 1989 || Kani || Y. Mizuno, T. Furuta || — || align=right | 5.3 km || 
|-id=145 bgcolor=#fefefe
| 19145 || 1989 YC || — || December 25, 1989 || Chions || J. M. Baur || CHL || align=right | 7.9 km || 
|-id=146 bgcolor=#fefefe
| 19146 || 1989 YY || — || December 30, 1989 || Siding Spring || R. H. McNaught || NYS || align=right | 2.4 km || 
|-id=147 bgcolor=#fefefe
| 19147 ||  || — || December 30, 1989 || Siding Spring || R. H. McNaught || MAS || align=right | 2.5 km || 
|-id=148 bgcolor=#d6d6d6
| 19148 Alaska ||  ||  || December 28, 1989 || Haute Provence || E. W. Elst || — || align=right | 11 km || 
|-id=149 bgcolor=#d6d6d6
| 19149 Boccaccio ||  ||  || March 2, 1990 || La Silla || E. W. Elst || 7:4 || align=right | 15 km || 
|-id=150 bgcolor=#E9E9E9
| 19150 || 1990 HY || — || April 26, 1990 || Palomar || E. F. Helin || MAR || align=right | 6.1 km || 
|-id=151 bgcolor=#E9E9E9
| 19151 ||  || — || May 20, 1990 || Siding Spring || R. H. McNaught || — || align=right | 4.5 km || 
|-id=152 bgcolor=#E9E9E9
| 19152 ||  || — || July 27, 1990 || Palomar || H. E. Holt || EUN || align=right | 5.1 km || 
|-id=153 bgcolor=#fefefe
| 19153 ||  || — || August 28, 1990 || Palomar || H. E. Holt || — || align=right | 2.5 km || 
|-id=154 bgcolor=#fefefe
| 19154 ||  || — || August 24, 1990 || Palomar || H. E. Holt || — || align=right | 2.7 km || 
|-id=155 bgcolor=#E9E9E9
| 19155 Lifeson ||  ||  || September 22, 1990 || Palomar || B. Roman || EUN || align=right | 5.9 km || 
|-id=156 bgcolor=#E9E9E9
| 19156 Heco ||  ||  || September 20, 1990 || Geisei || T. Seki || — || align=right | 5.8 km || 
|-id=157 bgcolor=#fefefe
| 19157 ||  || — || September 22, 1990 || La Silla || E. W. Elst || — || align=right | 3.2 km || 
|-id=158 bgcolor=#fefefe
| 19158 ||  || — || September 22, 1990 || La Silla || E. W. Elst || — || align=right | 3.6 km || 
|-id=159 bgcolor=#E9E9E9
| 19159 Taenakano || 1990 TT ||  || October 10, 1990 || Kitami || K. Endate, K. Watanabe || — || align=right | 6.7 km || 
|-id=160 bgcolor=#fefefe
| 19160 Chikayoshitomi ||  ||  || October 15, 1990 || Kitami || K. Endate, K. Watanabe || — || align=right | 3.0 km || 
|-id=161 bgcolor=#fefefe
| 19161 Sakawa ||  ||  || October 15, 1990 || Geisei || T. Seki || FLO || align=right | 2.2 km || 
|-id=162 bgcolor=#E9E9E9
| 19162 Wambsganss ||  ||  || October 10, 1990 || Tautenburg Observatory || L. D. Schmadel, F. Börngen || — || align=right | 5.8 km || 
|-id=163 bgcolor=#fefefe
| 19163 ||  || — || November 16, 1990 || La Silla || E. W. Elst || — || align=right | 1.8 km || 
|-id=164 bgcolor=#fefefe
| 19164 ||  || — || January 12, 1991 || Palomar || E. F. Helin || H || align=right | 3.4 km || 
|-id=165 bgcolor=#fefefe
| 19165 Nariyuki || 1991 CD ||  || February 4, 1991 || Kitami || K. Endate, K. Watanabe || — || align=right | 3.5 km || 
|-id=166 bgcolor=#fefefe
| 19166 ||  || — || March 7, 1991 || La Silla || H. Debehogne || FLO || align=right | 2.9 km || 
|-id=167 bgcolor=#fefefe
| 19167 ||  || — || March 9, 1991 || La Silla || H. Debehogne || FLO || align=right | 3.5 km || 
|-id=168 bgcolor=#d6d6d6
| 19168 ||  || — || March 14, 1991 || La Silla || H. Debehogne || EOS || align=right | 7.8 km || 
|-id=169 bgcolor=#fefefe
| 19169 || 1991 FD || — || March 17, 1991 || Palomar || E. F. Helin || PHO || align=right | 3.3 km || 
|-id=170 bgcolor=#d6d6d6
| 19170 || 1991 FH || — || March 18, 1991 || Siding Spring || R. H. McNaught || — || align=right | 13 km || 
|-id=171 bgcolor=#fefefe
| 19171 || 1991 FS || — || March 17, 1991 || Fujieda || H. Shiozawa, M. Kizawa || — || align=right | 3.0 km || 
|-id=172 bgcolor=#fefefe
| 19172 ||  || — || March 22, 1991 || La Silla || H. Debehogne || — || align=right | 5.9 km || 
|-id=173 bgcolor=#fefefe
| 19173 Virginiaterése ||  ||  || April 15, 1991 || Palomar || C. S. Shoemaker, E. M. Shoemaker || — || align=right | 8.4 km || 
|-id=174 bgcolor=#E9E9E9
| 19174 ||  || — || July 11, 1991 || La Silla || H. Debehogne || — || align=right | 6.2 km || 
|-id=175 bgcolor=#E9E9E9
| 19175 Peterpiot ||  ||  || August 2, 1991 || La Silla || E. W. Elst || — || align=right | 3.7 km || 
|-id=176 bgcolor=#E9E9E9
| 19176 ||  || — || August 2, 1991 || La Silla || E. W. Elst || — || align=right | 4.7 km || 
|-id=177 bgcolor=#E9E9E9
| 19177 ||  || — || August 9, 1991 || Palomar || H. E. Holt || — || align=right | 4.7 km || 
|-id=178 bgcolor=#E9E9E9
| 19178 Walterbothe ||  ||  || September 9, 1991 || Tautenburg Observatory || F. Börngen, L. D. Schmadel || — || align=right | 3.9 km || 
|-id=179 bgcolor=#E9E9E9
| 19179 ||  || — || September 12, 1991 || Palomar || H. E. Holt || — || align=right | 6.0 km || 
|-id=180 bgcolor=#E9E9E9
| 19180 ||  || — || September 15, 1991 || Palomar || H. E. Holt || — || align=right | 3.7 km || 
|-id=181 bgcolor=#E9E9E9
| 19181 ||  || — || September 30, 1991 || Siding Spring || R. H. McNaught || EUN || align=right | 4.6 km || 
|-id=182 bgcolor=#E9E9E9
| 19182 Pitz ||  ||  || October 7, 1991 || Tautenburg Observatory || L. D. Schmadel, F. Börngen || — || align=right | 2.7 km || 
|-id=183 bgcolor=#E9E9E9
| 19183 Amati ||  ||  || October 5, 1991 || Tautenburg Observatory || F. Börngen, L. D. Schmadel || EUN || align=right | 3.8 km || 
|-id=184 bgcolor=#E9E9E9
| 19184 ||  || — || October 6, 1991 || Kleť || A. Mrkos || — || align=right | 6.7 km || 
|-id=185 bgcolor=#E9E9E9
| 19185 Guarneri ||  ||  || October 4, 1991 || Tautenburg Observatory || F. Börngen || fast? || align=right | 3.4 km || 
|-id=186 bgcolor=#fefefe
| 19186 ||  || — || November 5, 1991 || Palomar || E. F. Helin || PHO || align=right | 4.2 km || 
|-id=187 bgcolor=#E9E9E9
| 19187 ||  || — || November 4, 1991 || Kiyosato || S. Otomo || ADE || align=right | 8.4 km || 
|-id=188 bgcolor=#E9E9E9
| 19188 Dittebesard || 1991 YT ||  || December 30, 1991 || Haute Provence || E. W. Elst || EUN || align=right | 5.0 km || 
|-id=189 bgcolor=#E9E9E9
| 19189 Stradivari ||  ||  || December 28, 1991 || Tautenburg Observatory || F. Börngen || EUN || align=right | 5.5 km || 
|-id=190 bgcolor=#E9E9E9
| 19190 Morihiroshi ||  ||  || January 10, 1992 || Okutama || T. Hioki, S. Hayakawa || PAD || align=right | 12 km || 
|-id=191 bgcolor=#d6d6d6
| 19191 ||  || — || February 23, 1992 || Kitt Peak || Spacewatch || KOR || align=right | 3.9 km || 
|-id=192 bgcolor=#d6d6d6
| 19192 ||  || — || February 29, 1992 || La Silla || UESAC || KOR || align=right | 5.5 km || 
|-id=193 bgcolor=#d6d6d6
| 19193 ||  || — || February 29, 1992 || La Silla || UESAC || KOR || align=right | 5.5 km || 
|-id=194 bgcolor=#d6d6d6
| 19194 ||  || — || February 29, 1992 || La Silla || UESAC || — || align=right | 7.8 km || 
|-id=195 bgcolor=#d6d6d6
| 19195 ||  || — || February 29, 1992 || La Silla || UESAC || KOR || align=right | 5.9 km || 
|-id=196 bgcolor=#d6d6d6
| 19196 ||  || — || February 29, 1992 || La Silla || UESAC || — || align=right | 3.6 km || 
|-id=197 bgcolor=#d6d6d6
| 19197 Akasaki || 1992 EO ||  || March 6, 1992 || Geisei || T. Seki || — || align=right | 14 km || 
|-id=198 bgcolor=#d6d6d6
| 19198 ||  || — || March 2, 1992 || La Silla || UESAC || KOR || align=right | 5.5 km || 
|-id=199 bgcolor=#d6d6d6
| 19199 ||  || — || March 26, 1992 || Kitt Peak || Spacewatch || THM || align=right | 8.1 km || 
|-id=200 bgcolor=#d6d6d6
| 19200 ||  || — || April 4, 1992 || La Silla || E. W. Elst || EOS || align=right | 7.0 km || 
|}

19201–19300 

|-bgcolor=#d6d6d6
| 19201 ||  || — || April 4, 1992 || La Silla || E. W. Elst || — || align=right | 13 km || 
|-id=202 bgcolor=#fefefe
| 19202 || 1992 HN || — || April 29, 1992 || Kitt Peak || Spacewatch || — || align=right | 3.4 km || 
|-id=203 bgcolor=#fefefe
| 19203 ||  || — || April 27, 1992 || Kitt Peak || Spacewatch || V || align=right | 2.2 km || 
|-id=204 bgcolor=#fefefe
| 19204 Joshuatree || 1992 ME ||  || June 21, 1992 || Palomar || J. E. Mueller || PHOslow || align=right | 4.3 km || 
|-id=205 bgcolor=#fefefe
| 19205 || 1992 PT || — || August 8, 1992 || Caussols || E. W. Elst || MAS || align=right | 2.6 km || 
|-id=206 bgcolor=#fefefe
| 19206 ||  || — || August 2, 1992 || Palomar || H. E. Holt || NYS || align=right | 3.4 km || 
|-id=207 bgcolor=#fefefe
| 19207 ||  || — || August 24, 1992 || Palomar || H. E. Holt || — || align=right | 7.0 km || 
|-id=208 bgcolor=#fefefe
| 19208 Starrfield || 1992 RW ||  || September 2, 1992 || Tautenburg Observatory || L. D. Schmadel, F. Börngen || NYS || align=right | 3.0 km || 
|-id=209 bgcolor=#fefefe
| 19209 ||  || — || October 25, 1992 || Kiyosato || S. Otomo || FLO || align=right | 3.0 km || 
|-id=210 bgcolor=#E9E9E9
| 19210 Higayoshihiro ||  ||  || December 25, 1992 || Geisei || T. Seki || — || align=right | 3.7 km || 
|-id=211 bgcolor=#E9E9E9
| 19211 || 1993 DM || — || February 21, 1993 || Kushiro || S. Ueda, H. Kaneda || — || align=right | 3.8 km || 
|-id=212 bgcolor=#E9E9E9
| 19212 ||  || — || March 17, 1993 || La Silla || UESAC || — || align=right | 4.7 km || 
|-id=213 bgcolor=#E9E9E9
| 19213 ||  || — || March 21, 1993 || La Silla || UESAC || AGN || align=right | 3.8 km || 
|-id=214 bgcolor=#d6d6d6
| 19214 ||  || — || March 21, 1993 || La Silla || UESAC || — || align=right | 9.5 km || 
|-id=215 bgcolor=#d6d6d6
| 19215 ||  || — || March 21, 1993 || La Silla || UESAC || 628 || align=right | 5.1 km || 
|-id=216 bgcolor=#E9E9E9
| 19216 ||  || — || March 19, 1993 || La Silla || UESAC || — || align=right | 4.5 km || 
|-id=217 bgcolor=#E9E9E9
| 19217 ||  || — || March 19, 1993 || La Silla || UESAC || — || align=right | 5.3 km || 
|-id=218 bgcolor=#d6d6d6
| 19218 ||  || — || March 19, 1993 || La Silla || UESAC || KOR || align=right | 4.4 km || 
|-id=219 bgcolor=#d6d6d6
| 19219 ||  || — || July 20, 1993 || La Silla || E. W. Elst || — || align=right | 10 km || 
|-id=220 bgcolor=#d6d6d6
| 19220 ||  || — || July 19, 1993 || La Silla || E. W. Elst || — || align=right | 9.0 km || 
|-id=221 bgcolor=#fefefe
| 19221 ||  || — || August 14, 1993 || Caussols || E. W. Elst || — || align=right | 3.1 km || 
|-id=222 bgcolor=#fefefe
| 19222 ||  || — || August 16, 1993 || Caussols || E. W. Elst || NYS || align=right | 7.3 km || 
|-id=223 bgcolor=#d6d6d6
| 19223 ||  || — || August 20, 1993 || La Silla || E. W. Elst || THM || align=right | 9.2 km || 
|-id=224 bgcolor=#fefefe
| 19224 Orosei ||  ||  || September 15, 1993 || Cima Ekar || A. Boattini || — || align=right | 2.2 km || 
|-id=225 bgcolor=#fefefe
| 19225 ||  || — || September 15, 1993 || La Silla || E. W. Elst || — || align=right | 3.8 km || 
|-id=226 bgcolor=#d6d6d6
| 19226 Peiresc ||  ||  || September 15, 1993 || La Silla || E. W. Elst || 7:4 || align=right | 13 km || 
|-id=227 bgcolor=#fefefe
| 19227 ||  || — || September 15, 1993 || La Silla || H. Debehogne, E. W. Elst || — || align=right | 2.9 km || 
|-id=228 bgcolor=#fefefe
| 19228 Uemuraikuo ||  ||  || September 16, 1993 || Kitami || K. Endate, K. Watanabe || FLO || align=right | 2.3 km || 
|-id=229 bgcolor=#fefefe
| 19229 ||  || — || September 19, 1993 || Caussols || E. W. Elst || — || align=right | 4.1 km || 
|-id=230 bgcolor=#fefefe
| 19230 Sugazi || 1993 TU ||  || October 11, 1993 || Kitami || K. Endate, K. Watanabe || — || align=right | 4.7 km || 
|-id=231 bgcolor=#fefefe
| 19231 ||  || — || October 9, 1993 || Kitt Peak || Spacewatch || — || align=right | 2.0 km || 
|-id=232 bgcolor=#fefefe
| 19232 ||  || — || October 9, 1993 || La Silla || E. W. Elst || — || align=right | 2.0 km || 
|-id=233 bgcolor=#fefefe
| 19233 ||  || — || October 20, 1993 || La Silla || E. W. Elst || FLO || align=right | 2.1 km || 
|-id=234 bgcolor=#fefefe
| 19234 Victoriahibbs ||  ||  || November 9, 1993 || Palomar || E. F. Helin || PHO || align=right | 3.3 km || 
|-id=235 bgcolor=#fefefe
| 19235 van Schurman ||  ||  || November 9, 1993 || Caussols || E. W. Elst || — || align=right | 11 km || 
|-id=236 bgcolor=#fefefe
| 19236 || 1993 XV || — || December 11, 1993 || Oizumi || T. Kobayashi || — || align=right | 3.7 km || 
|-id=237 bgcolor=#fefefe
| 19237 || 1994 AP || — || January 4, 1994 || Oizumi || T. Kobayashi || — || align=right | 4.2 km || 
|-id=238 bgcolor=#fefefe
| 19238 ||  || — || January 9, 1994 || Fujieda || H. Shiozawa, T. Urata || — || align=right | 4.1 km || 
|-id=239 bgcolor=#fefefe
| 19239 ||  || — || January 7, 1994 || Hidaka || H. Shiozawa || — || align=right | 5.0 km || 
|-id=240 bgcolor=#E9E9E9
| 19240 ||  || — || January 8, 1994 || Kitt Peak || Spacewatch || — || align=right | 2.0 km || 
|-id=241 bgcolor=#fefefe
| 19241 ||  || — || January 16, 1994 || Caussols || E. W. Elst, C. Pollas || NYS || align=right | 5.0 km || 
|-id=242 bgcolor=#E9E9E9
| 19242 ||  || — || February 3, 1994 || Kiyosato || S. Otomo || — || align=right | 4.5 km || 
|-id=243 bgcolor=#fefefe
| 19243 Bunting ||  ||  || February 10, 1994 || Palomar || C. S. Shoemaker, E. M. Shoemaker || PHO || align=right | 6.6 km || 
|-id=244 bgcolor=#fefefe
| 19244 ||  || — || February 7, 1994 || La Silla || E. W. Elst || — || align=right | 6.1 km || 
|-id=245 bgcolor=#E9E9E9
| 19245 ||  || — || March 8, 1994 || Palomar || E. F. Helin || MIT || align=right | 7.8 km || 
|-id=246 bgcolor=#fefefe
| 19246 ||  || — || March 14, 1994 || Nyukasa || M. Hirasawa, S. Suzuki || — || align=right | 3.3 km || 
|-id=247 bgcolor=#fefefe
| 19247 ||  || — || June 2, 1994 || Kitt Peak || Spacewatch || H || align=right | 3.1 km || 
|-id=248 bgcolor=#d6d6d6
| 19248 || 1994 PT || — || August 14, 1994 || Oizumi || T. Kobayashi || THM || align=right | 7.7 km || 
|-id=249 bgcolor=#d6d6d6
| 19249 ||  || — || August 12, 1994 || La Silla || E. W. Elst || KOR || align=right | 4.7 km || 
|-id=250 bgcolor=#d6d6d6
| 19250 Poullain ||  ||  || August 12, 1994 || La Silla || E. W. Elst || — || align=right | 7.7 km || 
|-id=251 bgcolor=#E9E9E9
| 19251 Totziens ||  ||  || September 3, 1994 || Zimmerwald || P. Wild || — || align=right | 5.1 km || 
|-id=252 bgcolor=#d6d6d6
| 19252 ||  || — || September 12, 1994 || Kitt Peak || Spacewatch || — || align=right | 7.4 km || 
|-id=253 bgcolor=#d6d6d6
| 19253 ||  || — || September 5, 1994 || La Silla || E. W. Elst || — || align=right | 6.2 km || 
|-id=254 bgcolor=#d6d6d6
| 19254 Shojitomoko ||  ||  || November 11, 1994 || Nyukasa || M. Hirasawa, S. Suzuki || ALA || align=right | 14 km || 
|-id=255 bgcolor=#C2E0FF
| 19255 ||  || — || November 8, 1994 || La Palma || A. Fitzsimmons, D. O'Ceallaigh, I. P. Williams || cubewano (cold)critical || align=right | 176 km || 
|-id=256 bgcolor=#E9E9E9
| 19256 ||  || — || November 28, 1994 || Kushiro || S. Ueda, H. Kaneda || — || align=right | 6.0 km || 
|-id=257 bgcolor=#fefefe
| 19257 ||  || — || February 22, 1995 || Kitt Peak || Spacewatch || — || align=right | 3.3 km || 
|-id=258 bgcolor=#fefefe
| 19258 Gongyi ||  ||  || March 24, 1995 || Xinglong || SCAP || V || align=right | 3.0 km || 
|-id=259 bgcolor=#fefefe
| 19259 || 1995 GB || — || April 1, 1995 || Oizumi || T. Kobayashi || NYS || align=right | 3.1 km || 
|-id=260 bgcolor=#fefefe
| 19260 || 1995 GT || — || April 4, 1995 || Kiyosato || S. Otomo || PHO || align=right | 5.0 km || 
|-id=261 bgcolor=#fefefe
| 19261 || 1995 MB || — || June 21, 1995 || Siding Spring || R. H. McNaught || — || align=right | 7.3 km || 
|-id=262 bgcolor=#E9E9E9
| 19262 Lucarubini ||  ||  || July 29, 1995 || Stroncone || A. Vagnozzi || — || align=right | 3.8 km || 
|-id=263 bgcolor=#E9E9E9
| 19263 Lavater ||  ||  || July 21, 1995 || Tautenburg Observatory || F. Börngen || — || align=right | 7.2 km || 
|-id=264 bgcolor=#E9E9E9
| 19264 ||  || — || September 17, 1995 || Kitt Peak || Spacewatch || — || align=right | 3.4 km || 
|-id=265 bgcolor=#E9E9E9
| 19265 ||  || — || September 19, 1995 || Kitt Peak || Spacewatch || NEM || align=right | 5.8 km || 
|-id=266 bgcolor=#E9E9E9
| 19266 ||  || — || October 14, 1995 || Xinglong || SCAP || — || align=right | 7.3 km || 
|-id=267 bgcolor=#E9E9E9
| 19267 ||  || — || October 15, 1995 || Kitt Peak || Spacewatch || — || align=right | 4.8 km || 
|-id=268 bgcolor=#E9E9E9
| 19268 Morstadt || 1995 UZ ||  || October 21, 1995 || Ondřejov || P. Pravec || — || align=right | 3.3 km || 
|-id=269 bgcolor=#E9E9E9
| 19269 ||  || — || October 17, 1995 || Kitt Peak || Spacewatch || MAR || align=right | 4.6 km || 
|-id=270 bgcolor=#d6d6d6
| 19270 ||  || — || November 14, 1995 || Kitt Peak || Spacewatch || KOR || align=right | 4.5 km || 
|-id=271 bgcolor=#d6d6d6
| 19271 ||  || — || November 15, 1995 || Kitt Peak || Spacewatch || — || align=right | 5.7 km || 
|-id=272 bgcolor=#E9E9E9
| 19272 ||  || — || November 17, 1995 || Kitt Peak || Spacewatch || HEN || align=right | 4.6 km || 
|-id=273 bgcolor=#E9E9E9
| 19273 || 1995 XJ || — || December 10, 1995 || Kleť || Kleť Obs. || GEF || align=right | 3.9 km || 
|-id=274 bgcolor=#d6d6d6
| 19274 ||  || — || December 15, 1995 || Oizumi || T. Kobayashi || EOS || align=right | 8.8 km || 
|-id=275 bgcolor=#d6d6d6
| 19275 ||  || — || December 15, 1995 || Oizumi || T. Kobayashi || — || align=right | 7.8 km || 
|-id=276 bgcolor=#d6d6d6
| 19276 ||  || — || December 14, 1995 || Kitt Peak || Spacewatch || — || align=right | 5.1 km || 
|-id=277 bgcolor=#d6d6d6
| 19277 || 1995 YD || — || December 17, 1995 || Oizumi || T. Kobayashi || — || align=right | 7.0 km || 
|-id=278 bgcolor=#d6d6d6
| 19278 || 1995 YN || — || December 19, 1995 || Oizumi || T. Kobayashi || — || align=right | 9.7 km || 
|-id=279 bgcolor=#d6d6d6
| 19279 ||  || — || December 28, 1995 || Haleakala || AMOS || 7:4 || align=right | 7.3 km || 
|-id=280 bgcolor=#d6d6d6
| 19280 || 1996 AV || — || January 11, 1996 || Oizumi || T. Kobayashi || VER || align=right | 10 km || 
|-id=281 bgcolor=#fefefe
| 19281 ||  || — || January 14, 1996 || Haleakala || AMOS || — || align=right | 4.5 km || 
|-id=282 bgcolor=#d6d6d6
| 19282 Zhangcunhao ||  ||  || January 14, 1996 || Xinglong || SCAP || THM || align=right | 8.6 km || 
|-id=283 bgcolor=#d6d6d6
| 19283 ||  || — || January 26, 1996 || Oizumi || T. Kobayashi || EOS || align=right | 7.7 km || 
|-id=284 bgcolor=#d6d6d6
| 19284 ||  || — || January 27, 1996 || Oizumi || T. Kobayashi || — || align=right | 8.1 km || 
|-id=285 bgcolor=#d6d6d6
| 19285 ||  || — || February 12, 1996 || Kushiro || S. Ueda, H. Kaneda || 7:4 || align=right | 18 km || 
|-id=286 bgcolor=#E9E9E9
| 19286 || 1996 DU || — || February 19, 1996 || Oizumi || T. Kobayashi || — || align=right | 4.8 km || 
|-id=287 bgcolor=#d6d6d6
| 19287 Paronelli ||  ||  || February 22, 1996 || Sormano || M. Cavagna, A. Testa || — || align=right | 9.9 km || 
|-id=288 bgcolor=#E9E9E9
| 19288 Egami ||  ||  || March 20, 1996 || Kitami || K. Endate, K. Watanabe || MAR || align=right | 9.0 km || 
|-id=289 bgcolor=#fefefe
| 19289 ||  || — || April 17, 1996 || La Silla || E. W. Elst || — || align=right | 2.4 km || 
|-id=290 bgcolor=#fefefe
| 19290 Schroeder ||  ||  || May 15, 1996 || Haleakala || NEAT || PHO || align=right | 3.7 km || 
|-id=291 bgcolor=#d6d6d6
| 19291 Karelzeman || 1996 LF ||  || June 6, 1996 || Ondřejov || P. Pravec, L. Kotková || — || align=right | 7.4 km || 
|-id=292 bgcolor=#fefefe
| 19292 ||  || — || July 14, 1996 || La Silla || E. W. Elst || — || align=right | 2.1 km || 
|-id=293 bgcolor=#fefefe
| 19293 Dedekind || 1996 OF ||  || July 18, 1996 || Prescott || P. G. Comba || V || align=right | 1.4 km || 
|-id=294 bgcolor=#fefefe
| 19294 Weymouth || 1996 PF ||  || August 6, 1996 || Lime Creek || R. Linderholm || — || align=right | 2.6 km || 
|-id=295 bgcolor=#fefefe
| 19295 ||  || — || September 10, 1996 || Haleakala || NEAT || — || align=right | 2.8 km || 
|-id=296 bgcolor=#fefefe
| 19296 ||  || — || September 13, 1996 || Haleakala || NEAT || — || align=right | 2.2 km || 
|-id=297 bgcolor=#fefefe
| 19297 ||  || — || September 8, 1996 || Kitt Peak || Spacewatch || V || align=right | 1.8 km || 
|-id=298 bgcolor=#fefefe
| 19298 Zhongkeda ||  ||  || September 20, 1996 || Xinglong || SCAP || V || align=right | 2.8 km || 
|-id=299 bgcolor=#C2E0FF
| 19299 ||  || — || September 16, 1996 || La Palma || A. Fitzsimmons, M. J. Irwin, I. P. Williams || plutino || align=right | 106 km || 
|-id=300 bgcolor=#fefefe
| 19300 ||  || — || September 18, 1996 || Xinglong || SCAP || — || align=right | 4.3 km || 
|}

19301–19400 

|-bgcolor=#E9E9E9
| 19301 ||  || — || September 21, 1996 || Xinglong || SCAP || — || align=right | 4.8 km || 
|-id=302 bgcolor=#fefefe
| 19302 || 1996 TD || — || October 1, 1996 || Uppsala || L. Kamél, K. Lundgren || FLO || align=right | 2.6 km || 
|-id=303 bgcolor=#fefefe
| 19303 Chinacyo ||  ||  || October 5, 1996 || Kitami || K. Endate, K. Watanabe || — || align=right | 2.8 km || 
|-id=304 bgcolor=#fefefe
| 19304 ||  || — || October 5, 1996 || Kitami || K. Endate, K. Watanabe || NYS || align=right | 2.4 km || 
|-id=305 bgcolor=#E9E9E9
| 19305 ||  || — || October 9, 1996 || Kushiro || S. Ueda, H. Kaneda || — || align=right | 3.9 km || 
|-id=306 bgcolor=#fefefe
| 19306 Voves ||  ||  || October 12, 1996 || Stroncone || Santa Lucia Obs. || NYS || align=right | 2.4 km || 
|-id=307 bgcolor=#fefefe
| 19307 Hanayama ||  ||  || October 14, 1996 || Kitami || K. Endate, K. Watanabe || NYS || align=right | 2.0 km || 
|-id=308 bgcolor=#C2E0FF
| 19308 ||  || — || October 12, 1996 || Mauna Kea || C. Trujillo, D. C. Jewitt, J. X. Luu || Haumea || align=right | 468 km || 
|-id=309 bgcolor=#fefefe
| 19309 ||  || — || October 20, 1996 || Kashihara || F. Uto || NYS || align=right | 3.0 km || 
|-id=310 bgcolor=#fefefe
| 19310 Osawa ||  ||  || November 4, 1996 || Tokyo-Mitaka || I. Satō, H. Fukushima || — || align=right | 4.4 km || 
|-id=311 bgcolor=#fefefe
| 19311 ||  || — || November 12, 1996 || Sudbury || D. di Cicco || — || align=right | 9.5 km || 
|-id=312 bgcolor=#fefefe
| 19312 ||  || — || November 15, 1996 || Nachi-Katsuura || Y. Shimizu, T. Urata || — || align=right | 3.0 km || 
|-id=313 bgcolor=#E9E9E9
| 19313 Shibatakazunari ||  ||  || November 6, 1996 || Kitami || K. Endate, K. Watanabe || EUN || align=right | 4.8 km || 
|-id=314 bgcolor=#E9E9E9
| 19314 Nakamuratetsu ||  ||  || November 7, 1996 || Kitami || K. Endate, K. Watanabe || EUN || align=right | 5.5 km || 
|-id=315 bgcolor=#fefefe
| 19315 ||  || — || November 7, 1996 || Kitami || K. Endate, K. Watanabe || FLO || align=right | 3.7 km || 
|-id=316 bgcolor=#E9E9E9
| 19316 || 1996 WB || — || November 16, 1996 || Oizumi || T. Kobayashi || EUN || align=right | 5.3 km || 
|-id=317 bgcolor=#E9E9E9
| 19317 ||  || — || November 30, 1996 || Oizumi || T. Kobayashi || — || align=right | 2.8 km || 
|-id=318 bgcolor=#fefefe
| 19318 Somanah ||  ||  || December 2, 1996 || Sormano || F. Manca, M. Cavagna || PHO || align=right | 4.3 km || 
|-id=319 bgcolor=#E9E9E9
| 19319 ||  || — || December 3, 1996 || Oizumi || T. Kobayashi || — || align=right | 3.0 km || 
|-id=320 bgcolor=#E9E9E9
| 19320 ||  || — || December 7, 1996 || Oizumi || T. Kobayashi || — || align=right | 3.8 km || 
|-id=321 bgcolor=#E9E9E9
| 19321 ||  || — || December 1, 1996 || Kitt Peak || Spacewatch || — || align=right | 5.8 km || 
|-id=322 bgcolor=#E9E9E9
| 19322 ||  || — || December 4, 1996 || Kitt Peak || Spacewatch || — || align=right | 5.7 km || 
|-id=323 bgcolor=#E9E9E9
| 19323 ||  || — || December 9, 1996 || Sudbury || D. di Cicco || — || align=right | 3.3 km || 
|-id=324 bgcolor=#E9E9E9
| 19324 ||  || — || December 7, 1996 || Kitt Peak || Spacewatch || — || align=right | 3.0 km || 
|-id=325 bgcolor=#fefefe
| 19325 ||  || — || December 7, 1996 || Kitt Peak || Spacewatch || — || align=right | 4.1 km || 
|-id=326 bgcolor=#fefefe
| 19326 ||  || — || December 8, 1996 || Oizumi || T. Kobayashi || — || align=right | 4.7 km || 
|-id=327 bgcolor=#E9E9E9
| 19327 ||  || — || December 8, 1996 || Oizumi || T. Kobayashi || — || align=right | 12 km || 
|-id=328 bgcolor=#fefefe
| 19328 ||  || — || December 12, 1996 || Kitt Peak || Spacewatch || — || align=right | 6.7 km || 
|-id=329 bgcolor=#fefefe
| 19329 ||  || — || December 14, 1996 || Oizumi || T. Kobayashi || V || align=right | 3.4 km || 
|-id=330 bgcolor=#E9E9E9
| 19330 ||  || — || December 14, 1996 || Oizumi || T. Kobayashi || — || align=right | 4.6 km || 
|-id=331 bgcolor=#E9E9E9
| 19331 Stefanovitale ||  ||  || December 4, 1996 || Cima Ekar || M. Tombelli, C. Casacci || — || align=right | 2.7 km || 
|-id=332 bgcolor=#E9E9E9
| 19332 ||  || — || December 18, 1996 || Xinglong || SCAP || — || align=right | 3.8 km || 
|-id=333 bgcolor=#E9E9E9
| 19333 ||  || — || December 19, 1996 || Xinglong || SCAP || — || align=right | 5.6 km || 
|-id=334 bgcolor=#E9E9E9
| 19334 ||  || — || December 19, 1996 || Xinglong || SCAP || MIS || align=right | 5.7 km || 
|-id=335 bgcolor=#fefefe
| 19335 ||  || — || December 28, 1996 || Oizumi || T. Kobayashi || V || align=right | 3.2 km || 
|-id=336 bgcolor=#E9E9E9
| 19336 || 1997 AF || — || January 2, 1997 || Oizumi || T. Kobayashi || — || align=right | 5.9 km || 
|-id=337 bgcolor=#fefefe
| 19337 || 1997 AT || — || January 2, 1997 || Oizumi || T. Kobayashi || — || align=right | 9.2 km || 
|-id=338 bgcolor=#E9E9E9
| 19338 ||  || — || January 3, 1997 || Oizumi || T. Kobayashi || — || align=right | 5.6 km || 
|-id=339 bgcolor=#E9E9E9
| 19339 ||  || — || January 6, 1997 || Oizumi || T. Kobayashi || DOR || align=right | 9.0 km || 
|-id=340 bgcolor=#E9E9E9
| 19340 ||  || — || January 6, 1997 || Oizumi || T. Kobayashi || — || align=right | 14 km || 
|-id=341 bgcolor=#d6d6d6
| 19341 ||  || — || January 7, 1997 || Oizumi || T. Kobayashi || — || align=right | 12 km || 
|-id=342 bgcolor=#E9E9E9
| 19342 ||  || — || January 9, 1997 || Oizumi || T. Kobayashi || — || align=right | 3.2 km || 
|-id=343 bgcolor=#fefefe
| 19343 ||  || — || January 5, 1997 || Xinglong || SCAP || NYS || align=right | 2.3 km || 
|-id=344 bgcolor=#E9E9E9
| 19344 ||  || — || January 2, 1997 || Xinglong || SCAP || — || align=right | 8.8 km || 
|-id=345 bgcolor=#d6d6d6
| 19345 ||  || — || January 30, 1997 || Oizumi || T. Kobayashi || — || align=right | 7.9 km || 
|-id=346 bgcolor=#E9E9E9
| 19346 ||  || — || February 1, 1997 || Oizumi || T. Kobayashi || — || align=right | 5.7 km || 
|-id=347 bgcolor=#E9E9E9
| 19347 ||  || — || February 1, 1997 || Kitt Peak || Spacewatch || — || align=right | 6.4 km || 
|-id=348 bgcolor=#d6d6d6
| 19348 Cueca ||  ||  || February 3, 1997 || Kitt Peak || Spacewatch || — || align=right | 6.6 km || 
|-id=349 bgcolor=#E9E9E9
| 19349 Denjoy ||  ||  || February 13, 1997 || Prescott || P. G. Comba || — || align=right | 4.4 km || 
|-id=350 bgcolor=#E9E9E9
| 19350 ||  || — || February 6, 1997 || Xinglong || SCAP || VIB || align=right | 8.7 km || 
|-id=351 bgcolor=#d6d6d6
| 19351 || 1997 EK || — || March 1, 1997 || Oizumi || T. Kobayashi || — || align=right | 12 km || 
|-id=352 bgcolor=#d6d6d6
| 19352 || 1997 EL || — || March 1, 1997 || Oizumi || T. Kobayashi || EOS || align=right | 12 km || 
|-id=353 bgcolor=#E9E9E9
| 19353 Pierrethierry ||  ||  || March 10, 1997 || Ramonville || C. Buil || — || align=right | 4.2 km || 
|-id=354 bgcolor=#d6d6d6
| 19354 Fredkoehler ||  ||  || March 31, 1997 || Socorro || LINEAR || — || align=right | 6.3 km || 
|-id=355 bgcolor=#d6d6d6
| 19355 Merpalehmann ||  ||  || March 31, 1997 || Socorro || LINEAR || — || align=right | 8.6 km || 
|-id=356 bgcolor=#FFC2E0
| 19356 ||  || — || April 6, 1997 || Haleakala || NEAT || AMO +1km || align=right data-sort-value="0.91" | 910 m || 
|-id=357 bgcolor=#d6d6d6
| 19357 ||  || — || April 2, 1997 || Socorro || LINEAR || — || align=right | 10 km || 
|-id=358 bgcolor=#d6d6d6
| 19358 ||  || — || April 6, 1997 || Socorro || LINEAR || 7:4 || align=right | 13 km || 
|-id=359 bgcolor=#d6d6d6
| 19359 ||  || — || April 3, 1997 || Socorro || LINEAR || — || align=right | 15 km || 
|-id=360 bgcolor=#d6d6d6
| 19360 ||  || — || May 3, 1997 || La Silla || E. W. Elst || THM || align=right | 6.8 km || 
|-id=361 bgcolor=#fefefe
| 19361 ||  || — || May 31, 1997 || Kitt Peak || Spacewatch || FLO || align=right | 3.9 km || 
|-id=362 bgcolor=#d6d6d6
| 19362 ||  || — || June 28, 1997 || Socorro || LINEAR || EOS || align=right | 5.8 km || 
|-id=363 bgcolor=#d6d6d6
| 19363 ||  || — || July 31, 1997 || Caussols || ODAS || — || align=right | 8.9 km || 
|-id=364 bgcolor=#E9E9E9
| 19364 Semafor ||  ||  || September 21, 1997 || Ondřejov || L. Kotková || — || align=right | 7.1 km || 
|-id=365 bgcolor=#fefefe
| 19365 ||  || — || November 8, 1997 || Oizumi || T. Kobayashi || — || align=right | 3.2 km || 
|-id=366 bgcolor=#E9E9E9
| 19366 Sudingqiang ||  ||  || November 6, 1997 || Xinglong || SCAP || EUN || align=right | 6.8 km || 
|-id=367 bgcolor=#fefefe
| 19367 Pink Floyd ||  ||  || December 3, 1997 || Caussols || ODAS || — || align=right | 6.7 km || 
|-id=368 bgcolor=#fefefe
| 19368 ||  || — || December 6, 1997 || Caussols || ODAS || — || align=right | 2.4 km || 
|-id=369 bgcolor=#d6d6d6
| 19369 || 1997 YO || — || December 20, 1997 || Oizumi || T. Kobayashi || TIR || align=right | 14 km || 
|-id=370 bgcolor=#E9E9E9
| 19370 Yukyung ||  ||  || December 25, 1997 || Haleakala || NEAT || — || align=right | 8.4 km || 
|-id=371 bgcolor=#fefefe
| 19371 ||  || — || December 27, 1997 || Gekko || T. Kagawa, T. Urata || — || align=right | 3.9 km || 
|-id=372 bgcolor=#fefefe
| 19372 ||  || — || December 31, 1997 || Oizumi || T. Kobayashi || — || align=right | 4.7 km || 
|-id=373 bgcolor=#fefefe
| 19373 ||  || — || December 31, 1997 || Oizumi || T. Kobayashi || FLO || align=right | 3.8 km || 
|-id=374 bgcolor=#fefefe
| 19374 ||  || — || December 27, 1997 || Kitt Peak || Spacewatch || V || align=right | 2.2 km || 
|-id=375 bgcolor=#fefefe
| 19375 ||  || — || January 6, 1998 || Woomera || F. B. Zoltowski || — || align=right | 2.4 km || 
|-id=376 bgcolor=#fefefe
| 19376 ||  || — || January 19, 1998 || Oizumi || T. Kobayashi || — || align=right | 2.3 km || 
|-id=377 bgcolor=#fefefe
| 19377 ||  || — || January 21, 1998 || Nachi-Katsuura || Y. Shimizu, T. Urata || FLO || align=right | 2.6 km || 
|-id=378 bgcolor=#fefefe
| 19378 ||  || — || January 24, 1998 || Oizumi || T. Kobayashi || V || align=right | 2.5 km || 
|-id=379 bgcolor=#fefefe
| 19379 Labrecque ||  ||  || January 24, 1998 || Haleakala || NEAT || PHO || align=right | 5.3 km || 
|-id=380 bgcolor=#fefefe
| 19380 ||  || — || January 23, 1998 || Socorro || LINEAR || V || align=right | 2.9 km || 
|-id=381 bgcolor=#fefefe
| 19381 ||  || — || January 24, 1998 || Haleakala || NEAT || — || align=right | 2.3 km || 
|-id=382 bgcolor=#fefefe
| 19382 ||  || — || January 28, 1998 || Oizumi || T. Kobayashi || — || align=right | 7.1 km || 
|-id=383 bgcolor=#fefefe
| 19383 Rolling Stones ||  ||  || January 29, 1998 || Caussols || ODAS || V || align=right | 2.7 km || 
|-id=384 bgcolor=#fefefe
| 19384 Winton ||  ||  || February 6, 1998 || Kleť || J. Tichá, M. Tichý || — || align=right | 2.8 km || 
|-id=385 bgcolor=#fefefe
| 19385 ||  || — || February 13, 1998 || Xinglong || SCAP || FLO || align=right | 2.9 km || 
|-id=386 bgcolor=#fefefe
| 19386 Axelcronstedt ||  ||  || February 6, 1998 || La Silla || E. W. Elst || — || align=right | 3.5 km || 
|-id=387 bgcolor=#fefefe
| 19387 ||  || — || February 18, 1998 || Woomera || F. B. Zoltowski || FLO || align=right | 3.0 km || 
|-id=388 bgcolor=#FA8072
| 19388 ||  || — || February 22, 1998 || Haleakala || NEAT || — || align=right | 3.6 km || 
|-id=389 bgcolor=#d6d6d6
| 19389 ||  || — || February 27, 1998 || Caussols || ODAS || — || align=right | 13 km || 
|-id=390 bgcolor=#fefefe
| 19390 Deledda ||  ||  || February 24, 1998 || Farra d'Isonzo || Farra d'Isonzo || — || align=right | 2.8 km || 
|-id=391 bgcolor=#fefefe
| 19391 ||  || — || February 22, 1998 || Haleakala || NEAT || — || align=right | 3.6 km || 
|-id=392 bgcolor=#fefefe
| 19392 Oyamada ||  ||  || February 22, 1998 || Nanyo || T. Okuni || V || align=right | 2.3 km || 
|-id=393 bgcolor=#fefefe
| 19393 Davidthompson ||  ||  || February 27, 1998 || La Silla || E. W. Elst || — || align=right | 2.3 km || 
|-id=394 bgcolor=#fefefe
| 19394 ||  || — || February 27, 1998 || La Silla || E. W. Elst || — || align=right | 2.4 km || 
|-id=395 bgcolor=#fefefe
| 19395 Barrera ||  ||  || March 2, 1998 || Caussols || ODAS || — || align=right | 3.2 km || 
|-id=396 bgcolor=#E9E9E9
| 19396 ||  || — || March 2, 1998 || Caussols || ODAS || — || align=right | 4.3 km || 
|-id=397 bgcolor=#fefefe
| 19397 Lagarini ||  ||  || March 3, 1998 || Caussols || ODAS || NYS || align=right | 2.3 km || 
|-id=398 bgcolor=#fefefe
| 19398 Creedence ||  ||  || March 2, 1998 || Sormano || P. Sicoli, P. Ghezzi || — || align=right | 2.4 km || 
|-id=399 bgcolor=#E9E9E9
| 19399 ||  || — || March 1, 1998 || La Silla || E. W. Elst || — || align=right | 5.6 km || 
|-id=400 bgcolor=#fefefe
| 19400 Emileclaus ||  ||  || March 1, 1998 || La Silla || E. W. Elst || — || align=right | 2.5 km || 
|}

19401–19500 

|-bgcolor=#E9E9E9
| 19401 ||  || — || March 1, 1998 || La Silla || E. W. Elst || — || align=right | 2.2 km || 
|-id=402 bgcolor=#FA8072
| 19402 ||  || — || March 1, 1998 || La Silla || E. W. Elst || — || align=right | 3.0 km || 
|-id=403 bgcolor=#E9E9E9
| 19403 ||  || — || March 18, 1998 || Kitt Peak || Spacewatch || — || align=right | 3.5 km || 
|-id=404 bgcolor=#E9E9E9
| 19404 ||  || — || March 24, 1998 || Woomera || F. B. Zoltowski || — || align=right | 4.7 km || 
|-id=405 bgcolor=#E9E9E9
| 19405 ||  || — || March 21, 1998 || Kitt Peak || Spacewatch || — || align=right | 4.0 km || 
|-id=406 bgcolor=#E9E9E9
| 19406 ||  || — || March 24, 1998 || Caussols || ODAS || — || align=right | 4.7 km || 
|-id=407 bgcolor=#E9E9E9
| 19407 Standing Bear ||  ||  || March 25, 1998 || Lime Creek || R. Linderholm || MAR || align=right | 6.6 km || 
|-id=408 bgcolor=#d6d6d6
| 19408 ||  || — || March 22, 1998 || Oizumi || T. Kobayashi || EOS || align=right | 6.3 km || 
|-id=409 bgcolor=#fefefe
| 19409 ||  || — || March 24, 1998 || Haleakala || NEAT || — || align=right | 3.2 km || 
|-id=410 bgcolor=#fefefe
| 19410 Guisard ||  ||  || March 26, 1998 || Caussols || ODAS || V || align=right | 2.4 km || 
|-id=411 bgcolor=#fefefe
| 19411 Collinarnold ||  ||  || March 20, 1998 || Socorro || LINEAR || — || align=right | 3.4 km || 
|-id=412 bgcolor=#fefefe
| 19412 ||  || — || March 20, 1998 || Socorro || LINEAR || — || align=right | 4.4 km || 
|-id=413 bgcolor=#fefefe
| 19413 Grantlewis ||  ||  || March 20, 1998 || Socorro || LINEAR || V || align=right | 2.6 km || 
|-id=414 bgcolor=#fefefe
| 19414 ||  || — || March 20, 1998 || Socorro || LINEAR || — || align=right | 5.2 km || 
|-id=415 bgcolor=#fefefe
| 19415 Parvamenon ||  ||  || March 20, 1998 || Socorro || LINEAR || ERI || align=right | 5.8 km || 
|-id=416 bgcolor=#fefefe
| 19416 Benglass ||  ||  || March 20, 1998 || Socorro || LINEAR || V || align=right | 2.3 km || 
|-id=417 bgcolor=#fefefe
| 19417 Madelynho ||  ||  || March 20, 1998 || Socorro || LINEAR || MAS || align=right | 2.4 km || 
|-id=418 bgcolor=#fefefe
| 19418 ||  || — || March 20, 1998 || Socorro || LINEAR || — || align=right | 3.7 km || 
|-id=419 bgcolor=#fefefe
| 19419 Pinkham ||  ||  || March 20, 1998 || Socorro || LINEAR || — || align=right | 3.6 km || 
|-id=420 bgcolor=#E9E9E9
| 19420 Vivekbuch ||  ||  || March 20, 1998 || Socorro || LINEAR || — || align=right | 5.8 km || 
|-id=421 bgcolor=#E9E9E9
| 19421 Zachulett ||  ||  || March 20, 1998 || Socorro || LINEAR || — || align=right | 4.9 km || 
|-id=422 bgcolor=#E9E9E9
| 19422 ||  || — || March 20, 1998 || Socorro || LINEAR || — || align=right | 4.4 km || 
|-id=423 bgcolor=#fefefe
| 19423 Hefter ||  ||  || March 20, 1998 || Socorro || LINEAR || — || align=right | 2.9 km || 
|-id=424 bgcolor=#E9E9E9
| 19424 Andrewsong ||  ||  || March 20, 1998 || Socorro || LINEAR || — || align=right | 2.2 km || 
|-id=425 bgcolor=#fefefe
| 19425 Nicholasrapp ||  ||  || March 20, 1998 || Socorro || LINEAR || — || align=right | 4.0 km || 
|-id=426 bgcolor=#E9E9E9
| 19426 Leal ||  ||  || March 20, 1998 || Socorro || LINEAR || — || align=right | 7.8 km || 
|-id=427 bgcolor=#E9E9E9
| 19427 ||  || — || March 20, 1998 || Socorro || LINEAR || — || align=right | 10 km || 
|-id=428 bgcolor=#E9E9E9
| 19428 Gracehsu ||  ||  || March 20, 1998 || Socorro || LINEAR || — || align=right | 4.1 km || 
|-id=429 bgcolor=#fefefe
| 19429 Grubaugh ||  ||  || March 20, 1998 || Socorro || LINEAR || NYS || align=right | 2.5 km || 
|-id=430 bgcolor=#fefefe
| 19430 Kristinaufer ||  ||  || March 20, 1998 || Socorro || LINEAR || — || align=right | 2.8 km || 
|-id=431 bgcolor=#d6d6d6
| 19431 ||  || — || March 20, 1998 || Socorro || LINEAR || MEL || align=right | 14 km || 
|-id=432 bgcolor=#fefefe
| 19432 ||  || — || March 20, 1998 || Socorro || LINEAR || — || align=right | 3.3 km || 
|-id=433 bgcolor=#E9E9E9
| 19433 Naftz ||  ||  || March 20, 1998 || Socorro || LINEAR || — || align=right | 4.0 km || 
|-id=434 bgcolor=#E9E9E9
| 19434 Bahuffman ||  ||  || March 24, 1998 || Socorro || LINEAR || — || align=right | 2.1 km || 
|-id=435 bgcolor=#E9E9E9
| 19435 ||  || — || March 24, 1998 || Socorro || LINEAR || MAR || align=right | 5.5 km || 
|-id=436 bgcolor=#fefefe
| 19436 Marycole ||  ||  || March 24, 1998 || Socorro || LINEAR || — || align=right | 3.4 km || 
|-id=437 bgcolor=#E9E9E9
| 19437 Jennyblank ||  ||  || March 24, 1998 || Socorro || LINEAR || — || align=right | 4.4 km || 
|-id=438 bgcolor=#fefefe
| 19438 Khaki ||  ||  || March 24, 1998 || Socorro || LINEAR || — || align=right | 3.7 km || 
|-id=439 bgcolor=#E9E9E9
| 19439 Allisontjong ||  ||  || March 24, 1998 || Socorro || LINEAR || — || align=right | 6.9 km || 
|-id=440 bgcolor=#fefefe
| 19440 Sumatijain ||  ||  || March 31, 1998 || Socorro || LINEAR || — || align=right | 2.9 km || 
|-id=441 bgcolor=#E9E9E9
| 19441 Trucpham ||  ||  || March 31, 1998 || Socorro || LINEAR || — || align=right | 8.0 km || 
|-id=442 bgcolor=#E9E9E9
| 19442 Brianrice ||  ||  || March 31, 1998 || Socorro || LINEAR || — || align=right | 6.8 km || 
|-id=443 bgcolor=#fefefe
| 19443 Yanzhong ||  ||  || March 31, 1998 || Socorro || LINEAR || — || align=right | 2.5 km || 
|-id=444 bgcolor=#fefefe
| 19444 Addicott ||  ||  || March 31, 1998 || Socorro || LINEAR || FLO || align=right | 4.0 km || 
|-id=445 bgcolor=#E9E9E9
| 19445 ||  || — || March 31, 1998 || Socorro || LINEAR || — || align=right | 8.4 km || 
|-id=446 bgcolor=#fefefe
| 19446 Muroski ||  ||  || March 31, 1998 || Socorro || LINEAR || ERI || align=right | 6.4 km || 
|-id=447 bgcolor=#fefefe
| 19447 Jessicapearl ||  ||  || March 31, 1998 || Socorro || LINEAR || V || align=right | 2.8 km || 
|-id=448 bgcolor=#fefefe
| 19448 Jenniferling ||  ||  || March 20, 1998 || Socorro || LINEAR || — || align=right | 2.3 km || 
|-id=449 bgcolor=#E9E9E9
| 19449 ||  || — || March 24, 1998 || Socorro || LINEAR || ADE || align=right | 8.7 km || 
|-id=450 bgcolor=#fefefe
| 19450 Sussman ||  ||  || March 24, 1998 || Socorro || LINEAR || — || align=right | 3.0 km || 
|-id=451 bgcolor=#E9E9E9
| 19451 ||  || — || March 31, 1998 || Socorro || LINEAR || — || align=right | 6.3 km || 
|-id=452 bgcolor=#fefefe
| 19452 Keeney ||  ||  || March 31, 1998 || Socorro || LINEAR || V || align=right | 2.7 km || 
|-id=453 bgcolor=#fefefe
| 19453 Murdochorne ||  ||  || March 28, 1998 || Reedy Creek || J. Broughton || — || align=right | 2.9 km || 
|-id=454 bgcolor=#fefefe
| 19454 Henrymarr ||  ||  || March 25, 1998 || Socorro || LINEAR || V || align=right | 2.6 km || 
|-id=455 bgcolor=#fefefe
| 19455 ||  || — || March 24, 1998 || Socorro || LINEAR || V || align=right | 4.2 km || 
|-id=456 bgcolor=#fefefe
| 19456 Pimdouglas ||  ||  || April 21, 1998 || Caussols || ODAS || FLO || align=right | 2.6 km || 
|-id=457 bgcolor=#d6d6d6
| 19457 Robcastillo ||  ||  || April 21, 1998 || Caussols || ODAS || — || align=right | 11 km || 
|-id=458 bgcolor=#fefefe
| 19458 Legault ||  ||  || April 21, 1998 || Les Tardieux Obs. || M. Boeuf || — || align=right | 2.6 km || 
|-id=459 bgcolor=#fefefe
| 19459 ||  || — || April 18, 1998 || Kitt Peak || Spacewatch || — || align=right | 4.1 km || 
|-id=460 bgcolor=#E9E9E9
| 19460 ||  || — || April 18, 1998 || Socorro || LINEAR || — || align=right | 7.0 km || 
|-id=461 bgcolor=#E9E9E9
| 19461 Feingold ||  ||  || April 18, 1998 || Socorro || LINEAR || — || align=right | 3.5 km || 
|-id=462 bgcolor=#d6d6d6
| 19462 Ulissedini ||  ||  || April 27, 1998 || Prescott || P. G. Comba || KOR || align=right | 7.8 km || 
|-id=463 bgcolor=#E9E9E9
| 19463 Emilystoll ||  ||  || April 20, 1998 || Socorro || LINEAR || — || align=right | 5.4 km || 
|-id=464 bgcolor=#E9E9E9
| 19464 Ciarabarr ||  ||  || April 20, 1998 || Socorro || LINEAR || — || align=right | 5.3 km || 
|-id=465 bgcolor=#E9E9E9
| 19465 Amandarusso ||  ||  || April 20, 1998 || Socorro || LINEAR || PAD || align=right | 5.9 km || 
|-id=466 bgcolor=#E9E9E9
| 19466 Darcydiegel ||  ||  || April 20, 1998 || Socorro || LINEAR || WIT || align=right | 2.4 km || 
|-id=467 bgcolor=#E9E9E9
| 19467 Amandanagy ||  ||  || April 20, 1998 || Socorro || LINEAR || — || align=right | 4.2 km || 
|-id=468 bgcolor=#E9E9E9
| 19468 ||  || — || April 20, 1998 || Socorro || LINEAR || — || align=right | 4.5 km || 
|-id=469 bgcolor=#E9E9E9
| 19469 ||  || — || April 20, 1998 || Socorro || LINEAR || — || align=right | 7.2 km || 
|-id=470 bgcolor=#d6d6d6
| 19470 Wenpingchen ||  ||  || April 30, 1998 || Anderson Mesa || LONEOS || KOR || align=right | 5.3 km || 
|-id=471 bgcolor=#d6d6d6
| 19471 ||  || — || April 25, 1998 || Woomera || F. B. Zoltowski || — || align=right | 6.8 km || 
|-id=472 bgcolor=#E9E9E9
| 19472 ||  || — || April 27, 1998 || Woomera || F. B. Zoltowski || — || align=right | 5.7 km || 
|-id=473 bgcolor=#fefefe
| 19473 Marygardner ||  ||  || April 21, 1998 || Socorro || LINEAR || — || align=right | 3.3 km || 
|-id=474 bgcolor=#d6d6d6
| 19474 ||  || — || April 21, 1998 || Socorro || LINEAR || — || align=right | 7.7 km || 
|-id=475 bgcolor=#fefefe
| 19475 Mispagel ||  ||  || April 21, 1998 || Socorro || LINEAR || ERI || align=right | 3.7 km || 
|-id=476 bgcolor=#E9E9E9
| 19476 Denduluri ||  ||  || April 21, 1998 || Socorro || LINEAR || HEN || align=right | 4.2 km || 
|-id=477 bgcolor=#d6d6d6
| 19477 Teresajentz ||  ||  || April 21, 1998 || Socorro || LINEAR || KOR || align=right | 5.7 km || 
|-id=478 bgcolor=#fefefe
| 19478 Jaimeflores ||  ||  || April 21, 1998 || Socorro || LINEAR || NYS || align=right | 3.1 km || 
|-id=479 bgcolor=#d6d6d6
| 19479 ||  || — || April 21, 1998 || Socorro || LINEAR || — || align=right | 9.1 km || 
|-id=480 bgcolor=#E9E9E9
| 19480 ||  || — || April 21, 1998 || Socorro || LINEAR || GEF || align=right | 5.7 km || 
|-id=481 bgcolor=#d6d6d6
| 19481 ||  || — || April 25, 1998 || La Silla || E. W. Elst || — || align=right | 7.3 km || 
|-id=482 bgcolor=#d6d6d6
| 19482 Harperlee ||  ||  || April 25, 1998 || La Silla || E. W. Elst || LIX || align=right | 13 km || 
|-id=483 bgcolor=#fefefe
| 19483 ||  || — || April 23, 1998 || Socorro || LINEAR || — || align=right | 4.7 km || 
|-id=484 bgcolor=#fefefe
| 19484 Vanessaspini ||  ||  || April 23, 1998 || Socorro || LINEAR || V || align=right | 3.1 km || 
|-id=485 bgcolor=#d6d6d6
| 19485 ||  || — || April 23, 1998 || Socorro || LINEAR || EOSslow || align=right | 10 km || 
|-id=486 bgcolor=#E9E9E9
| 19486 ||  || — || April 23, 1998 || Socorro || LINEAR || — || align=right | 6.6 km || 
|-id=487 bgcolor=#fefefe
| 19487 Rosscoleman ||  ||  || April 23, 1998 || Socorro || LINEAR || — || align=right | 3.9 km || 
|-id=488 bgcolor=#fefefe
| 19488 Abramcoley ||  ||  || April 23, 1998 || Socorro || LINEAR || — || align=right | 2.9 km || 
|-id=489 bgcolor=#E9E9E9
| 19489 ||  || — || April 25, 1998 || La Silla || E. W. Elst || — || align=right | 4.7 km || 
|-id=490 bgcolor=#E9E9E9
| 19490 ||  || — || April 19, 1998 || Kitt Peak || Spacewatch || — || align=right | 5.7 km || 
|-id=491 bgcolor=#E9E9E9
| 19491 ||  || — || April 24, 1998 || Socorro || LINEAR || — || align=right | 7.1 km || 
|-id=492 bgcolor=#fefefe
| 19492 || 1998 JT || — || May 1, 1998 || Haleakala || NEAT || — || align=right | 3.3 km || 
|-id=493 bgcolor=#E9E9E9
| 19493 ||  || — || May 1, 1998 || Haleakala || NEAT || — || align=right | 4.5 km || 
|-id=494 bgcolor=#d6d6d6
| 19494 Gerbs ||  ||  || May 23, 1998 || Anderson Mesa || LONEOS || EOS || align=right | 8.5 km || 
|-id=495 bgcolor=#E9E9E9
| 19495 Terentyeva ||  ||  || May 23, 1998 || Anderson Mesa || LONEOS || MAR || align=right | 6.0 km || 
|-id=496 bgcolor=#fefefe
| 19496 Josephbarone ||  ||  || May 22, 1998 || Socorro || LINEAR || NYS || align=right | 3.0 km || 
|-id=497 bgcolor=#fefefe
| 19497 Pineda ||  ||  || May 22, 1998 || Socorro || LINEAR || NYS || align=right | 2.9 km || 
|-id=498 bgcolor=#E9E9E9
| 19498 ||  || — || May 22, 1998 || Socorro || LINEAR || — || align=right | 5.4 km || 
|-id=499 bgcolor=#E9E9E9
| 19499 Eugenybiryukov ||  ||  || May 27, 1998 || Anderson Mesa || LONEOS || — || align=right | 4.5 km || 
|-id=500 bgcolor=#E9E9E9
| 19500 Hillaryfultz ||  ||  || May 23, 1998 || Socorro || LINEAR || — || align=right | 7.6 km || 
|}

19501–19600 

|-bgcolor=#d6d6d6
| 19501 ||  || — || May 23, 1998 || Socorro || LINEAR || — || align=right | 15 km || 
|-id=502 bgcolor=#E9E9E9
| 19502 ||  || — || May 23, 1998 || Socorro || LINEAR || — || align=right | 5.0 km || 
|-id=503 bgcolor=#d6d6d6
| 19503 ||  || — || May 22, 1998 || Socorro || LINEAR || INA || align=right | 14 km || 
|-id=504 bgcolor=#d6d6d6
| 19504 Vladalekseev ||  ||  || June 1, 1998 || La Silla || E. W. Elst || EOS || align=right | 8.9 km || 
|-id=505 bgcolor=#E9E9E9
| 19505 || 1998 MC || — || June 16, 1998 || Woomera || F. B. Zoltowski || — || align=right | 3.8 km || 
|-id=506 bgcolor=#d6d6d6
| 19506 Angellopez ||  ||  || June 18, 1998 || Majorca || Á. López J., R. Pacheco || — || align=right | 8.5 km || 
|-id=507 bgcolor=#d6d6d6
| 19507 ||  || — || June 19, 1998 || Caussols || ODAS || — || align=right | 11 km || 
|-id=508 bgcolor=#d6d6d6
| 19508 ||  || — || June 27, 1998 || Kitt Peak || Spacewatch || — || align=right | 9.1 km || 
|-id=509 bgcolor=#E9E9E9
| 19509 Niigata ||  ||  || June 29, 1998 || Anderson Mesa || LONEOS || — || align=right | 7.5 km || 
|-id=510 bgcolor=#fefefe
| 19510 ||  || — || June 26, 1998 || La Silla || E. W. Elst || FLO || align=right | 3.2 km || 
|-id=511 bgcolor=#E9E9E9
| 19511 ||  || — || June 19, 1998 || Socorro || LINEAR || EUN || align=right | 4.6 km || 
|-id=512 bgcolor=#E9E9E9
| 19512 ||  || — || August 17, 1998 || Socorro || LINEAR || — || align=right | 4.0 km || 
|-id=513 bgcolor=#d6d6d6
| 19513 ||  || — || August 17, 1998 || Socorro || LINEAR || 7:4 || align=right | 16 km || 
|-id=514 bgcolor=#E9E9E9
| 19514 ||  || — || August 24, 1998 || Socorro || LINEAR || EUN || align=right | 5.4 km || 
|-id=515 bgcolor=#E9E9E9
| 19515 ||  || — || August 24, 1998 || Socorro || LINEAR || — || align=right | 6.6 km || 
|-id=516 bgcolor=#fefefe
| 19516 ||  || — || August 24, 1998 || Socorro || LINEAR || — || align=right | 11 km || 
|-id=517 bgcolor=#E9E9E9
| 19517 Robertocarlos ||  ||  || September 18, 1998 || La Silla || E. W. Elst || — || align=right | 11 km || 
|-id=518 bgcolor=#fefefe
| 19518 Moulding ||  ||  || November 10, 1998 || Socorro || LINEAR || — || align=right | 3.6 km || 
|-id=519 bgcolor=#fefefe
| 19519 ||  || — || November 18, 1998 || Kushiro || S. Ueda, H. Kaneda || — || align=right | 3.8 km || 
|-id=520 bgcolor=#E9E9E9
| 19520 ||  || — || November 25, 1998 || Socorro || LINEAR || EUN || align=right | 6.7 km || 
|-id=521 bgcolor=#C2E0FF
| 19521 Chaos ||  ||  || November 19, 1998 || Kitt Peak || DES || cubewano (hot) || align=right | 523 km || 
|-id=522 bgcolor=#E9E9E9
| 19522 ||  || — || December 15, 1998 || Socorro || LINEAR || EUN || align=right | 6.7 km || 
|-id=523 bgcolor=#E9E9E9
| 19523 Paolofrisi ||  ||  || December 18, 1998 || Bologna || San Vittore Obs. || — || align=right | 6.9 km || 
|-id=524 bgcolor=#E9E9E9
| 19524 Acaciacoleman ||  ||  || December 23, 1998 || Kanab || E. E. Sheridan || — || align=right | 6.0 km || 
|-id=525 bgcolor=#fefefe
| 19525 || 1999 CO || — || February 5, 1999 || Oizumi || T. Kobayashi || — || align=right | 9.9 km || 
|-id=526 bgcolor=#fefefe
| 19526 ||  || — || March 20, 1999 || Socorro || LINEAR || — || align=right | 2.4 km || 
|-id=527 bgcolor=#fefefe
| 19527 ||  || — || March 19, 1999 || Socorro || LINEAR || — || align=right | 4.7 km || 
|-id=528 bgcolor=#d6d6d6
| 19528 Delloro ||  ||  || April 4, 1999 || San Marcello || G. D'Abramo, A. Boattini || THM || align=right | 8.0 km || 
|-id=529 bgcolor=#fefefe
| 19529 ||  || — || April 15, 1999 || Kitt Peak || Spacewatch || NYS || align=right | 2.9 km || 
|-id=530 bgcolor=#fefefe
| 19530 ||  || — || April 6, 1999 || Socorro || LINEAR || — || align=right | 7.4 km || 
|-id=531 bgcolor=#fefefe
| 19531 Charton ||  ||  || April 7, 1999 || Socorro || LINEAR || FLO || align=right | 3.2 km || 
|-id=532 bgcolor=#fefefe
| 19532 ||  || — || April 6, 1999 || Socorro || LINEAR || — || align=right | 3.7 km || 
|-id=533 bgcolor=#fefefe
| 19533 Garrison ||  ||  || April 7, 1999 || Socorro || LINEAR || — || align=right | 2.9 km || 
|-id=534 bgcolor=#fefefe
| 19534 Miyagi ||  ||  || April 6, 1999 || Anderson Mesa || LONEOS || — || align=right | 3.1 km || 
|-id=535 bgcolor=#E9E9E9
| 19535 Rowanatkinson ||  ||  || April 24, 1999 || Reedy Creek || J. Broughton || — || align=right | 5.1 km || 
|-id=536 bgcolor=#fefefe
| 19536 ||  || — || May 10, 1999 || Socorro || LINEAR || PHO || align=right | 2.7 km || 
|-id=537 bgcolor=#fefefe
| 19537 ||  || — || May 12, 1999 || Socorro || LINEAR || H || align=right | 3.4 km || 
|-id=538 bgcolor=#fefefe
| 19538 ||  || — || May 13, 1999 || Socorro || LINEAR || — || align=right | 3.7 km || 
|-id=539 bgcolor=#fefefe
| 19539 Anaverdu ||  ||  || May 14, 1999 || Ametlla de Mar || J. Nomen || — || align=right | 2.1 km || 
|-id=540 bgcolor=#fefefe
| 19540 ||  || — || May 10, 1999 || Socorro || LINEAR || — || align=right | 2.3 km || 
|-id=541 bgcolor=#fefefe
| 19541 ||  || — || May 10, 1999 || Socorro || LINEAR || NYS || align=right | 2.4 km || 
|-id=542 bgcolor=#fefefe
| 19542 Lindperkins ||  ||  || May 10, 1999 || Socorro || LINEAR || — || align=right | 2.1 km || 
|-id=543 bgcolor=#fefefe
| 19543 Burgoyne ||  ||  || May 10, 1999 || Socorro || LINEAR || FLO || align=right | 2.5 km || 
|-id=544 bgcolor=#fefefe
| 19544 Avramkottke ||  ||  || May 10, 1999 || Socorro || LINEAR || NYS || align=right | 3.8 km || 
|-id=545 bgcolor=#fefefe
| 19545 ||  || — || May 10, 1999 || Socorro || LINEAR || — || align=right | 4.8 km || 
|-id=546 bgcolor=#fefefe
| 19546 ||  || — || May 10, 1999 || Socorro || LINEAR || — || align=right | 3.7 km || 
|-id=547 bgcolor=#fefefe
| 19547 Collier ||  ||  || May 10, 1999 || Socorro || LINEAR || — || align=right | 2.2 km || 
|-id=548 bgcolor=#E9E9E9
| 19548 ||  || — || May 10, 1999 || Socorro || LINEAR || — || align=right | 6.3 km || 
|-id=549 bgcolor=#fefefe
| 19549 ||  || — || May 10, 1999 || Socorro || LINEAR || FLO || align=right | 3.2 km || 
|-id=550 bgcolor=#fefefe
| 19550 Samabates ||  ||  || May 10, 1999 || Socorro || LINEAR || — || align=right | 2.7 km || 
|-id=551 bgcolor=#fefefe
| 19551 Peterborden ||  ||  || May 10, 1999 || Socorro || LINEAR || — || align=right | 3.5 km || 
|-id=552 bgcolor=#fefefe
| 19552 ||  || — || May 12, 1999 || Socorro || LINEAR || NYS || align=right | 2.6 km || 
|-id=553 bgcolor=#E9E9E9
| 19553 ||  || — || May 12, 1999 || Socorro || LINEAR || — || align=right | 3.8 km || 
|-id=554 bgcolor=#E9E9E9
| 19554 ||  || — || May 12, 1999 || Socorro || LINEAR || — || align=right | 3.6 km || 
|-id=555 bgcolor=#E9E9E9
| 19555 ||  || — || May 12, 1999 || Socorro || LINEAR || RAF || align=right | 5.0 km || 
|-id=556 bgcolor=#fefefe
| 19556 ||  || — || May 12, 1999 || Socorro || LINEAR || — || align=right | 5.7 km || 
|-id=557 bgcolor=#E9E9E9
| 19557 ||  || — || May 13, 1999 || Socorro || LINEAR || MAR || align=right | 8.4 km || 
|-id=558 bgcolor=#fefefe
| 19558 ||  || — || May 12, 1999 || Socorro || LINEAR || — || align=right | 6.3 km || 
|-id=559 bgcolor=#E9E9E9
| 19559 ||  || — || May 12, 1999 || Socorro || LINEAR || EUN || align=right | 5.7 km || 
|-id=560 bgcolor=#E9E9E9
| 19560 ||  || — || May 14, 1999 || Socorro || LINEAR || — || align=right | 5.2 km || 
|-id=561 bgcolor=#E9E9E9
| 19561 ||  || — || May 14, 1999 || Socorro || LINEAR || — || align=right | 5.5 km || 
|-id=562 bgcolor=#E9E9E9
| 19562 ||  || — || May 14, 1999 || Socorro || LINEAR || EUN || align=right | 6.9 km || 
|-id=563 bgcolor=#fefefe
| 19563 Brzezinska ||  ||  || May 14, 1999 || Socorro || LINEAR || FLO || align=right | 2.9 km || 
|-id=564 bgcolor=#fefefe
| 19564 Ajburnetti ||  ||  || May 13, 1999 || Socorro || LINEAR || — || align=right | 2.8 km || 
|-id=565 bgcolor=#d6d6d6
| 19565 ||  || — || May 20, 1999 || Socorro || LINEAR || — || align=right | 17 km || 
|-id=566 bgcolor=#fefefe
| 19566 ||  || — || May 23, 1999 || Woomera || F. B. Zoltowski || NYS || align=right | 2.7 km || 
|-id=567 bgcolor=#E9E9E9
| 19567 ||  || — || May 20, 1999 || Socorro || LINEAR || — || align=right | 8.2 km || 
|-id=568 bgcolor=#fefefe
| 19568 Rachelmarie ||  ||  || May 18, 1999 || Socorro || LINEAR || — || align=right | 3.7 km || 
|-id=569 bgcolor=#E9E9E9
| 19569 ||  || — || May 20, 1999 || Socorro || LINEAR || — || align=right | 6.8 km || 
|-id=570 bgcolor=#fefefe
| 19570 Jessedouglas ||  ||  || June 13, 1999 || Prescott || P. G. Comba || — || align=right | 6.4 km || 
|-id=571 bgcolor=#fefefe
| 19571 ||  || — || June 8, 1999 || Kitt Peak || Spacewatch || NYS || align=right | 3.7 km || 
|-id=572 bgcolor=#fefefe
| 19572 Leahmarie ||  ||  || June 8, 1999 || Socorro || LINEAR || — || align=right | 2.5 km || 
|-id=573 bgcolor=#fefefe
| 19573 Cummings ||  ||  || June 9, 1999 || Socorro || LINEAR || V || align=right | 3.0 km || 
|-id=574 bgcolor=#fefefe
| 19574 Davidedwards ||  ||  || June 9, 1999 || Socorro || LINEAR || — || align=right | 3.2 km || 
|-id=575 bgcolor=#fefefe
| 19575 Feeny ||  ||  || June 9, 1999 || Socorro || LINEAR || FLO || align=right | 2.1 km || 
|-id=576 bgcolor=#fefefe
| 19576 ||  || — || June 9, 1999 || Socorro || LINEAR || — || align=right | 2.5 km || 
|-id=577 bgcolor=#fefefe
| 19577 Bobbyfisher ||  ||  || June 9, 1999 || Socorro || LINEAR || — || align=right | 3.6 km || 
|-id=578 bgcolor=#fefefe
| 19578 Kirkdouglas || 1999 MO ||  || June 20, 1999 || Reedy Creek || J. Broughton || NYS || align=right | 2.7 km || 
|-id=579 bgcolor=#E9E9E9
| 19579 ||  || — || June 23, 1999 || Woomera || F. B. Zoltowski || — || align=right | 4.1 km || 
|-id=580 bgcolor=#d6d6d6
| 19580 || 1999 ND || — || July 4, 1999 || Višnjan Observatory || K. Korlević || FIR || align=right | 13 km || 
|-id=581 bgcolor=#E9E9E9
| 19581 ||  || — || July 13, 1999 || Socorro || LINEAR || — || align=right | 4.9 km || 
|-id=582 bgcolor=#E9E9E9
| 19582 Blow ||  ||  || July 13, 1999 || Reedy Creek || J. Broughton || — || align=right | 3.1 km || 
|-id=583 bgcolor=#fefefe
| 19583 ||  || — || July 12, 1999 || Višnjan Observatory || K. Korlević || — || align=right | 2.5 km || 
|-id=584 bgcolor=#E9E9E9
| 19584 Sarahgerin ||  ||  || July 13, 1999 || Socorro || LINEAR || — || align=right | 3.2 km || 
|-id=585 bgcolor=#d6d6d6
| 19585 Zachopkins ||  ||  || July 13, 1999 || Socorro || LINEAR || — || align=right | 4.2 km || 
|-id=586 bgcolor=#d6d6d6
| 19586 ||  || — || July 13, 1999 || Socorro || LINEAR || KOR || align=right | 6.2 km || 
|-id=587 bgcolor=#d6d6d6
| 19587 Keremane ||  ||  || July 13, 1999 || Socorro || LINEAR || KOR || align=right | 6.5 km || 
|-id=588 bgcolor=#d6d6d6
| 19588 ||  || — || July 13, 1999 || Socorro || LINEAR || THM || align=right | 9.5 km || 
|-id=589 bgcolor=#fefefe
| 19589 Kirkland ||  ||  || July 14, 1999 || Socorro || LINEAR || V || align=right | 3.9 km || 
|-id=590 bgcolor=#d6d6d6
| 19590 ||  || — || July 14, 1999 || Socorro || LINEAR || ALA || align=right | 16 km || 
|-id=591 bgcolor=#E9E9E9
| 19591 Michaelklein ||  ||  || July 14, 1999 || Socorro || LINEAR || — || align=right | 6.7 km || 
|-id=592 bgcolor=#E9E9E9
| 19592 ||  || — || July 14, 1999 || Socorro || LINEAR || — || align=right | 3.2 km || 
|-id=593 bgcolor=#d6d6d6
| 19593 Justinkoh ||  ||  || July 14, 1999 || Socorro || LINEAR || — || align=right | 5.3 km || 
|-id=594 bgcolor=#fefefe
| 19594 ||  || — || July 14, 1999 || Socorro || LINEAR || — || align=right | 7.3 km || 
|-id=595 bgcolor=#E9E9E9
| 19595 Lafer-Sousa ||  ||  || July 14, 1999 || Socorro || LINEAR || — || align=right | 2.9 km || 
|-id=596 bgcolor=#E9E9E9
| 19596 Spegorlarson ||  ||  || July 14, 1999 || Socorro || LINEAR || — || align=right | 3.9 km || 
|-id=597 bgcolor=#d6d6d6
| 19597 Ryanlee ||  ||  || July 14, 1999 || Socorro || LINEAR || KOR || align=right | 4.1 km || 
|-id=598 bgcolor=#fefefe
| 19598 Luttrell ||  ||  || July 14, 1999 || Socorro || LINEAR || slow? || align=right | 2.5 km || 
|-id=599 bgcolor=#fefefe
| 19599 Brycemelton ||  ||  || July 14, 1999 || Socorro || LINEAR || — || align=right | 3.5 km || 
|-id=600 bgcolor=#E9E9E9
| 19600 ||  || — || July 14, 1999 || Socorro || LINEAR || — || align=right | 7.0 km || 
|}

19601–19700 

|-bgcolor=#d6d6d6
| 19601 ||  || — || July 14, 1999 || Socorro || LINEAR || THM || align=right | 7.7 km || 
|-id=602 bgcolor=#fefefe
| 19602 Austinminor ||  ||  || July 14, 1999 || Socorro || LINEAR || — || align=right | 7.6 km || 
|-id=603 bgcolor=#E9E9E9
| 19603 Monier ||  ||  || July 13, 1999 || Socorro || LINEAR || — || align=right | 4.2 km || 
|-id=604 bgcolor=#E9E9E9
| 19604 ||  || — || July 13, 1999 || Socorro || LINEAR || GEF || align=right | 4.3 km || 
|-id=605 bgcolor=#E9E9E9
| 19605 ||  || — || July 12, 1999 || Socorro || LINEAR || MAR || align=right | 6.0 km || 
|-id=606 bgcolor=#d6d6d6
| 19606 ||  || — || July 12, 1999 || Socorro || LINEAR || EOS || align=right | 4.9 km || 
|-id=607 bgcolor=#E9E9E9
| 19607 ||  || — || July 12, 1999 || Socorro || LINEAR || MAR || align=right | 5.1 km || 
|-id=608 bgcolor=#d6d6d6
| 19608 ||  || — || July 12, 1999 || Socorro || LINEAR || — || align=right | 13 km || 
|-id=609 bgcolor=#E9E9E9
| 19609 ||  || — || July 12, 1999 || Socorro || LINEAR || — || align=right | 5.2 km || 
|-id=610 bgcolor=#E9E9E9
| 19610 ||  || — || July 13, 1999 || Socorro || LINEAR || — || align=right | 7.0 km || 
|-id=611 bgcolor=#d6d6d6
| 19611 ||  || — || July 14, 1999 || Socorro || LINEAR || EOS || align=right | 5.6 km || 
|-id=612 bgcolor=#fefefe
| 19612 Noordung || 1999 OO ||  || July 17, 1999 || Črni Vrh || Črni Vrh || V || align=right | 3.7 km || 
|-id=613 bgcolor=#E9E9E9
| 19613 || 1999 OX || — || July 19, 1999 || Kleť || Kleť Obs. || GEF || align=right | 5.1 km || 
|-id=614 bgcolor=#fefefe
| 19614 Montelongo ||  ||  || July 16, 1999 || Socorro || LINEAR || V || align=right | 2.5 km || 
|-id=615 bgcolor=#d6d6d6
| 19615 ||  || — || July 22, 1999 || Socorro || LINEAR || — || align=right | 22 km || 
|-id=616 bgcolor=#fefefe
| 19616 ||  || — || July 24, 1999 || Bickley || Perth Obs. || FLO || align=right | 3.1 km || 
|-id=617 bgcolor=#d6d6d6
| 19617 Duhamel ||  ||  || August 8, 1999 || Prescott || P. G. Comba || — || align=right | 11 km || 
|-id=618 bgcolor=#fefefe
| 19618 Maša ||  ||  || August 11, 1999 || Črni Vrh || J. Skvarč || — || align=right | 4.1 km || 
|-id=619 bgcolor=#fefefe
| 19619 Bethbell || 1999 QA ||  || August 16, 1999 || Farpoint || G. Bell || — || align=right | 2.3 km || 
|-id=620 bgcolor=#E9E9E9
| 19620 Auckland || 1999 QG ||  || August 18, 1999 || Auckland || Stardome Obs. || EUN || align=right | 4.7 km || 
|-id=621 bgcolor=#E9E9E9
| 19621 ||  || — || September 4, 1999 || Gekko || T. Kagawa || MAR || align=right | 5.2 km || 
|-id=622 bgcolor=#d6d6d6
| 19622 ||  || — || September 6, 1999 || Višnjan Observatory || K. Korlević || — || align=right | 11 km || 
|-id=623 bgcolor=#fefefe
| 19623 ||  || — || September 4, 1999 || Catalina || CSS || V || align=right | 2.7 km || 
|-id=624 bgcolor=#d6d6d6
| 19624 ||  || — || September 7, 1999 || Socorro || LINEAR || — || align=right | 9.0 km || 
|-id=625 bgcolor=#fefefe
| 19625 Ovaitt ||  ||  || September 7, 1999 || Socorro || LINEAR || — || align=right | 5.1 km || 
|-id=626 bgcolor=#d6d6d6
| 19626 ||  || — || September 7, 1999 || Socorro || LINEAR || — || align=right | 11 km || 
|-id=627 bgcolor=#d6d6d6
| 19627 ||  || — || September 7, 1999 || Socorro || LINEAR || — || align=right | 6.1 km || 
|-id=628 bgcolor=#d6d6d6
| 19628 ||  || — || September 7, 1999 || Socorro || LINEAR || — || align=right | 6.1 km || 
|-id=629 bgcolor=#E9E9E9
| 19629 Serra ||  ||  || September 8, 1999 || Guitalens || A. Klotz || HEN || align=right | 4.7 km || 
|-id=630 bgcolor=#E9E9E9
| 19630 Janebell ||  ||  || September 2, 1999 || Farpoint || G. Bell || MAR || align=right | 4.2 km || 
|-id=631 bgcolor=#E9E9E9
| 19631 Greensleeves ||  ||  || September 13, 1999 || Reedy Creek || J. Broughton || GEF || align=right | 4.4 km || 
|-id=632 bgcolor=#d6d6d6
| 19632 ||  || — || September 13, 1999 || Zeno || T. Stafford || — || align=right | 5.6 km || 
|-id=633 bgcolor=#fefefe
| 19633 Rusjan ||  ||  || September 13, 1999 || Črni Vrh || Črni Vrh || — || align=right | 4.4 km || 
|-id=634 bgcolor=#d6d6d6
| 19634 ||  || — || September 14, 1999 || Fountain Hills || C. W. Juels || — || align=right | 18 km || 
|-id=635 bgcolor=#E9E9E9
| 19635 ||  || — || September 7, 1999 || Socorro || LINEAR || ADE || align=right | 7.0 km || 
|-id=636 bgcolor=#d6d6d6
| 19636 ||  || — || September 7, 1999 || Socorro || LINEAR || THM || align=right | 12 km || 
|-id=637 bgcolor=#fefefe
| 19637 Presbrey ||  ||  || September 7, 1999 || Socorro || LINEAR || FLO || align=right | 2.4 km || 
|-id=638 bgcolor=#E9E9E9
| 19638 Johngenereid ||  ||  || September 7, 1999 || Socorro || LINEAR || HOF || align=right | 5.7 km || 
|-id=639 bgcolor=#E9E9E9
| 19639 ||  || — || September 7, 1999 || Socorro || LINEAR || — || align=right | 8.8 km || 
|-id=640 bgcolor=#E9E9E9
| 19640 Ethanroth ||  ||  || September 7, 1999 || Socorro || LINEAR || XIZslow || align=right | 4.8 km || 
|-id=641 bgcolor=#E9E9E9
| 19641 ||  || — || September 7, 1999 || Socorro || LINEAR || GEF || align=right | 4.9 km || 
|-id=642 bgcolor=#d6d6d6
| 19642 ||  || — || September 7, 1999 || Socorro || LINEAR || — || align=right | 12 km || 
|-id=643 bgcolor=#d6d6d6
| 19643 Jacobrucker ||  ||  || September 7, 1999 || Socorro || LINEAR || THM || align=right | 7.8 km || 
|-id=644 bgcolor=#d6d6d6
| 19644 ||  || — || September 8, 1999 || Socorro || LINEAR || — || align=right | 11 km || 
|-id=645 bgcolor=#d6d6d6
| 19645 ||  || — || September 8, 1999 || Socorro || LINEAR || — || align=right | 7.3 km || 
|-id=646 bgcolor=#d6d6d6
| 19646 ||  || — || September 8, 1999 || Socorro || LINEAR || — || align=right | 23 km || 
|-id=647 bgcolor=#d6d6d6
| 19647 ||  || — || September 8, 1999 || Socorro || LINEAR || EOS || align=right | 8.3 km || 
|-id=648 bgcolor=#E9E9E9
| 19648 ||  || — || September 8, 1999 || Socorro || LINEAR || EUN || align=right | 7.3 km || 
|-id=649 bgcolor=#d6d6d6
| 19649 ||  || — || September 8, 1999 || Socorro || LINEAR || CRO || align=right | 11 km || 
|-id=650 bgcolor=#d6d6d6
| 19650 ||  || — || September 8, 1999 || Socorro || LINEAR || URS || align=right | 12 km || 
|-id=651 bgcolor=#E9E9E9
| 19651 ||  || — || September 9, 1999 || Socorro || LINEAR || — || align=right | 7.1 km || 
|-id=652 bgcolor=#E9E9E9
| 19652 Saris ||  ||  || September 9, 1999 || Socorro || LINEAR || HOF || align=right | 4.7 km || 
|-id=653 bgcolor=#E9E9E9
| 19653 ||  || — || September 9, 1999 || Socorro || LINEAR || MAR || align=right | 6.0 km || 
|-id=654 bgcolor=#E9E9E9
| 19654 ||  || — || September 9, 1999 || Socorro || LINEAR || EUN || align=right | 5.5 km || 
|-id=655 bgcolor=#d6d6d6
| 19655 ||  || — || September 9, 1999 || Socorro || LINEAR || EOS || align=right | 6.8 km || 
|-id=656 bgcolor=#fefefe
| 19656 Simpkins ||  ||  || September 9, 1999 || Socorro || LINEAR || V || align=right | 2.2 km || 
|-id=657 bgcolor=#fefefe
| 19657 ||  || — || September 9, 1999 || Socorro || LINEAR || V || align=right | 4.4 km || 
|-id=658 bgcolor=#E9E9E9
| 19658 Sloop ||  ||  || September 9, 1999 || Socorro || LINEAR || — || align=right | 2.9 km || 
|-id=659 bgcolor=#d6d6d6
| 19659 ||  || — || September 9, 1999 || Socorro || LINEAR || EOS || align=right | 4.7 km || 
|-id=660 bgcolor=#fefefe
| 19660 Danielsteck ||  ||  || September 9, 1999 || Socorro || LINEAR || — || align=right | 2.8 km || 
|-id=661 bgcolor=#E9E9E9
| 19661 ||  || — || September 9, 1999 || Socorro || LINEAR || DOR || align=right | 12 km || 
|-id=662 bgcolor=#fefefe
| 19662 Stunzi ||  ||  || September 9, 1999 || Socorro || LINEAR || V || align=right | 3.0 km || 
|-id=663 bgcolor=#E9E9E9
| 19663 Rykerwatts ||  ||  || September 9, 1999 || Socorro || LINEAR || — || align=right | 4.7 km || 
|-id=664 bgcolor=#d6d6d6
| 19664 Yancey ||  ||  || September 9, 1999 || Socorro || LINEAR || — || align=right | 8.2 km || 
|-id=665 bgcolor=#d6d6d6
| 19665 ||  || — || September 9, 1999 || Socorro || LINEAR || EOS || align=right | 9.7 km || 
|-id=666 bgcolor=#E9E9E9
| 19666 ||  || — || September 9, 1999 || Socorro || LINEAR || — || align=right | 5.1 km || 
|-id=667 bgcolor=#d6d6d6
| 19667 ||  || — || September 9, 1999 || Socorro || LINEAR || EOS || align=right | 7.7 km || 
|-id=668 bgcolor=#d6d6d6
| 19668 ||  || — || September 9, 1999 || Socorro || LINEAR || — || align=right | 14 km || 
|-id=669 bgcolor=#E9E9E9
| 19669 ||  || — || September 9, 1999 || Socorro || LINEAR || — || align=right | 4.4 km || 
|-id=670 bgcolor=#d6d6d6
| 19670 ||  || — || September 9, 1999 || Socorro || LINEAR || — || align=right | 8.2 km || 
|-id=671 bgcolor=#d6d6d6
| 19671 ||  || — || September 9, 1999 || Socorro || LINEAR || — || align=right | 14 km || 
|-id=672 bgcolor=#fefefe
| 19672 ||  || — || September 9, 1999 || Socorro || LINEAR || — || align=right | 3.1 km || 
|-id=673 bgcolor=#d6d6d6
| 19673 ||  || — || September 9, 1999 || Socorro || LINEAR || — || align=right | 13 km || 
|-id=674 bgcolor=#E9E9E9
| 19674 ||  || — || September 9, 1999 || Socorro || LINEAR || GEF || align=right | 4.6 km || 
|-id=675 bgcolor=#fefefe
| 19675 ||  || — || September 9, 1999 || Socorro || LINEAR || NYS || align=right | 2.8 km || 
|-id=676 bgcolor=#fefefe
| 19676 Ofeliaguilar ||  ||  || September 9, 1999 || Socorro || LINEAR || FLO || align=right | 3.2 km || 
|-id=677 bgcolor=#d6d6d6
| 19677 ||  || — || September 9, 1999 || Socorro || LINEAR || BRA || align=right | 4.7 km || 
|-id=678 bgcolor=#d6d6d6
| 19678 Belczyk ||  ||  || September 9, 1999 || Socorro || LINEAR || — || align=right | 8.2 km || 
|-id=679 bgcolor=#fefefe
| 19679 Gretabetteo ||  ||  || September 9, 1999 || Socorro || LINEAR || — || align=right | 3.8 km || 
|-id=680 bgcolor=#fefefe
| 19680 ||  || — || September 9, 1999 || Socorro || LINEAR || V || align=right | 3.8 km || 
|-id=681 bgcolor=#d6d6d6
| 19681 ||  || — || September 7, 1999 || Socorro || LINEAR || — || align=right | 9.9 km || 
|-id=682 bgcolor=#E9E9E9
| 19682 ||  || — || September 8, 1999 || Socorro || LINEAR || — || align=right | 4.8 km || 
|-id=683 bgcolor=#E9E9E9
| 19683 ||  || — || September 8, 1999 || Socorro || LINEAR || CLO || align=right | 8.2 km || 
|-id=684 bgcolor=#d6d6d6
| 19684 ||  || — || September 8, 1999 || Socorro || LINEAR || — || align=right | 7.7 km || 
|-id=685 bgcolor=#d6d6d6
| 19685 ||  || — || September 8, 1999 || Socorro || LINEAR || — || align=right | 15 km || 
|-id=686 bgcolor=#d6d6d6
| 19686 ||  || — || September 8, 1999 || Socorro || LINEAR || EOS || align=right | 9.7 km || 
|-id=687 bgcolor=#E9E9E9
| 19687 ||  || — || September 8, 1999 || Socorro || LINEAR || — || align=right | 6.7 km || 
|-id=688 bgcolor=#d6d6d6
| 19688 ||  || — || September 8, 1999 || Socorro || LINEAR || EOS || align=right | 9.5 km || 
|-id=689 bgcolor=#d6d6d6
| 19689 ||  || — || September 8, 1999 || Socorro || LINEAR || SYL7:4 || align=right | 12 km || 
|-id=690 bgcolor=#d6d6d6
| 19690 ||  || — || September 8, 1999 || Socorro || LINEAR || — || align=right | 17 km || 
|-id=691 bgcolor=#E9E9E9
| 19691 Iwate ||  ||  || September 5, 1999 || Anderson Mesa || LONEOS || PAD || align=right | 13 km || 
|-id=692 bgcolor=#fefefe
| 19692 ||  || — || September 5, 1999 || Catalina || CSS || — || align=right | 3.7 km || 
|-id=693 bgcolor=#d6d6d6
| 19693 ||  || — || September 8, 1999 || Catalina || CSS || EOS || align=right | 10 km || 
|-id=694 bgcolor=#d6d6d6
| 19694 Dunkelman ||  ||  || September 8, 1999 || Catalina || CSS || 7:4 || align=right | 15 km || 
|-id=695 bgcolor=#fefefe
| 19695 Billnye ||  ||  || September 8, 1999 || Catalina || CSS || FLO || align=right | 3.5 km || 
|-id=696 bgcolor=#d6d6d6
| 19696 ||  || — || September 18, 1999 || Socorro || LINEAR || URS || align=right | 14 km || 
|-id=697 bgcolor=#d6d6d6
| 19697 ||  || — || September 29, 1999 || Višnjan Observatory || K. Korlević || THM || align=right | 9.0 km || 
|-id=698 bgcolor=#E9E9E9
| 19698 ||  || — || September 29, 1999 || Višnjan Observatory || K. Korlević || GEF || align=right | 7.1 km || 
|-id=699 bgcolor=#E9E9E9
| 19699 ||  || — || September 29, 1999 || Socorro || LINEAR || — || align=right | 5.1 km || 
|-id=700 bgcolor=#E9E9E9
| 19700 Teitelbaum ||  ||  || September 30, 1999 || Catalina || CSS || EUN || align=right | 6.6 km || 
|}

19701–19800 

|-bgcolor=#E9E9E9
| 19701 Aomori ||  ||  || September 29, 1999 || Anderson Mesa || LONEOS || HNS || align=right | 4.0 km || 
|-id=702 bgcolor=#d6d6d6
| 19702 ||  || — || September 30, 1999 || Socorro || LINEAR || HYG || align=right | 12 km || 
|-id=703 bgcolor=#d6d6d6
| 19703 ||  || — || October 3, 1999 || Socorro || LINEAR || — || align=right | 11 km || 
|-id=704 bgcolor=#d6d6d6
| 19704 Medlock ||  ||  || October 7, 1999 || Hudson || S. Brady || THM || align=right | 11 km || 
|-id=705 bgcolor=#d6d6d6
| 19705 ||  || — || October 7, 1999 || Višnjan Observatory || K. Korlević, M. Jurić || — || align=right | 14 km || 
|-id=706 bgcolor=#d6d6d6
| 19706 ||  || — || October 10, 1999 || Višnjan Observatory || K. Korlević, M. Jurić || MEL || align=right | 17 km || 
|-id=707 bgcolor=#fefefe
| 19707 Tokunai ||  ||  || October 8, 1999 || Nanyo || T. Okuni || FLO || align=right | 4.3 km || 
|-id=708 bgcolor=#fefefe
| 19708 ||  || — || October 4, 1999 || Socorro || LINEAR || — || align=right | 2.8 km || 
|-id=709 bgcolor=#d6d6d6
| 19709 ||  || — || October 3, 1999 || Socorro || LINEAR || — || align=right | 12 km || 
|-id=710 bgcolor=#E9E9E9
| 19710 ||  || — || October 12, 1999 || Socorro || LINEAR || — || align=right | 7.2 km || 
|-id=711 bgcolor=#fefefe
| 19711 Johnaligawesa ||  ||  || October 1, 1999 || Catalina || CSS || PHO || align=right | 4.7 km || 
|-id=712 bgcolor=#d6d6d6
| 19712 ||  || — || October 1, 1999 || Catalina || CSS || — || align=right | 16 km || 
|-id=713 bgcolor=#d6d6d6
| 19713 Ibaraki ||  ||  || October 3, 1999 || Anderson Mesa || LONEOS || HYG || align=right | 12 km || 
|-id=714 bgcolor=#fefefe
| 19714 || 1999 UD || — || October 16, 1999 || Višnjan Observatory || K. Korlević || — || align=right | 3.3 km || 
|-id=715 bgcolor=#d6d6d6
| 19715 Basodino ||  ||  || October 27, 1999 || Gnosca || S. Sposetti || — || align=right | 15 km || 
|-id=716 bgcolor=#E9E9E9
| 19716 ||  || — || October 28, 1999 || Catalina || CSS || — || align=right | 7.8 km || 
|-id=717 bgcolor=#E9E9E9
| 19717 ||  || — || October 16, 1999 || Višnjan Observatory || Višnjan Obs. || — || align=right | 4.7 km || 
|-id=718 bgcolor=#E9E9E9
| 19718 Albertjarvis ||  ||  || November 5, 1999 || Jornada || D. S. Dixon || EUN || align=right | 5.6 km || 
|-id=719 bgcolor=#d6d6d6
| 19719 Glasser ||  ||  || November 9, 1999 || Fountain Hills || C. W. Juels || — || align=right | 14 km || 
|-id=720 bgcolor=#E9E9E9
| 19720 ||  || — || November 9, 1999 || Oizumi || T. Kobayashi || DOR || align=right | 14 km || 
|-id=721 bgcolor=#d6d6d6
| 19721 Wray ||  ||  || November 10, 1999 || Fountain Hills || C. W. Juels || — || align=right | 10 km || 
|-id=722 bgcolor=#E9E9E9
| 19722 ||  || — || November 3, 1999 || Socorro || LINEAR || MAR || align=right | 4.8 km || 
|-id=723 bgcolor=#E9E9E9
| 19723 ||  || — || November 4, 1999 || Catalina || CSS || — || align=right | 4.0 km || 
|-id=724 bgcolor=#d6d6d6
| 19724 ||  || — || November 9, 1999 || Catalina || CSS || EOS || align=right | 8.2 km || 
|-id=725 bgcolor=#C2FFFF
| 19725 ||  || — || November 28, 1999 || Oizumi || T. Kobayashi || L4 || align=right | 32 km || 
|-id=726 bgcolor=#d6d6d6
| 19726 || 1999 XL || — || December 1, 1999 || Socorro || LINEAR || — || align=right | 10 km || 
|-id=727 bgcolor=#fefefe
| 19727 Allen ||  ||  || December 4, 1999 || Fountain Hills || C. W. Juels || — || align=right | 5.9 km || 
|-id=728 bgcolor=#fefefe
| 19728 ||  || — || December 6, 1999 || Socorro || LINEAR || — || align=right | 11 km || 
|-id=729 bgcolor=#fefefe
| 19729 ||  || — || December 6, 1999 || Višnjan Observatory || K. Korlević || — || align=right | 3.0 km || 
|-id=730 bgcolor=#d6d6d6
| 19730 Machiavelli ||  ||  || December 7, 1999 || Fountain Hills || C. W. Juels || Tj (2.96) || align=right | 9.7 km || 
|-id=731 bgcolor=#d6d6d6
| 19731 Tochigi ||  ||  || December 9, 1999 || Anderson Mesa || LONEOS || — || align=right | 9.9 km || 
|-id=732 bgcolor=#fefefe
| 19732 ||  || — || December 8, 1999 || Socorro || LINEAR || — || align=right | 9.3 km || 
|-id=733 bgcolor=#E9E9E9
| 19733 ||  || — || December 10, 1999 || Socorro || LINEAR || EUN || align=right | 5.9 km || 
|-id=734 bgcolor=#E9E9E9
| 19734 ||  || — || December 10, 1999 || Socorro || LINEAR || — || align=right | 4.4 km || 
|-id=735 bgcolor=#E9E9E9
| 19735 ||  || — || December 14, 1999 || Socorro || LINEAR || EUN || align=right | 5.4 km || 
|-id=736 bgcolor=#d6d6d6
| 19736 ||  || — || January 4, 2000 || Socorro || LINEAR || EOS || align=right | 9.2 km || 
|-id=737 bgcolor=#d6d6d6
| 19737 ||  || — || January 4, 2000 || Socorro || LINEAR || — || align=right | 48 km || 
|-id=738 bgcolor=#fefefe
| 19738 Calinger ||  ||  || January 4, 2000 || Socorro || LINEAR || — || align=right | 3.3 km || 
|-id=739 bgcolor=#fefefe
| 19739 ||  || — || January 5, 2000 || Socorro || LINEAR || FLO || align=right | 3.8 km || 
|-id=740 bgcolor=#E9E9E9
| 19740 ||  || — || January 5, 2000 || Socorro || LINEAR || GEF || align=right | 5.7 km || 
|-id=741 bgcolor=#fefefe
| 19741 Callahan ||  ||  || January 5, 2000 || Socorro || LINEAR || — || align=right | 3.9 km || 
|-id=742 bgcolor=#fefefe
| 19742 ||  || — || January 4, 2000 || Socorro || LINEAR || — || align=right | 2.9 km || 
|-id=743 bgcolor=#E9E9E9
| 19743 ||  || — || January 5, 2000 || Socorro || LINEAR || — || align=right | 6.4 km || 
|-id=744 bgcolor=#E9E9E9
| 19744 ||  || — || January 7, 2000 || Socorro || LINEAR || — || align=right | 11 km || 
|-id=745 bgcolor=#E9E9E9
| 19745 ||  || — || January 9, 2000 || Socorro || LINEAR || EUN || align=right | 4.6 km || 
|-id=746 bgcolor=#d6d6d6
| 19746 ||  || — || January 9, 2000 || Socorro || LINEAR || — || align=right | 13 km || 
|-id=747 bgcolor=#E9E9E9
| 19747 ||  || — || January 9, 2000 || Socorro || LINEAR || — || align=right | 6.9 km || 
|-id=748 bgcolor=#d6d6d6
| 19748 ||  || — || January 27, 2000 || Socorro || LINEAR || Tj (2.99) || align=right | 19 km || 
|-id=749 bgcolor=#d6d6d6
| 19749 ||  || — || February 2, 2000 || Socorro || LINEAR || — || align=right | 6.4 km || 
|-id=750 bgcolor=#E9E9E9
| 19750 ||  || — || February 2, 2000 || Socorro || LINEAR || MAR || align=right | 5.9 km || 
|-id=751 bgcolor=#E9E9E9
| 19751 ||  || — || February 2, 2000 || Socorro || LINEAR || — || align=right | 3.7 km || 
|-id=752 bgcolor=#d6d6d6
| 19752 ||  || — || February 6, 2000 || Socorro || LINEAR || Tj (2.89) || align=right | 23 km || 
|-id=753 bgcolor=#fefefe
| 19753 ||  || — || February 8, 2000 || Socorro || LINEAR || — || align=right | 2.8 km || 
|-id=754 bgcolor=#fefefe
| 19754 Paclements ||  ||  || February 8, 2000 || Socorro || LINEAR || FLO || align=right | 2.6 km || 
|-id=755 bgcolor=#E9E9E9
| 19755 ||  || — || March 5, 2000 || Socorro || LINEAR || — || align=right | 6.7 km || 
|-id=756 bgcolor=#E9E9E9
| 19756 ||  || — || March 9, 2000 || Majorca || Á. López J., R. Pacheco || — || align=right | 4.9 km || 
|-id=757 bgcolor=#E9E9E9
| 19757 ||  || — || April 2, 2000 || Socorro || LINEAR || EUN || align=right | 4.2 km || 
|-id=758 bgcolor=#fefefe
| 19758 Janelcoulson ||  ||  || April 7, 2000 || Socorro || LINEAR || FLO || align=right | 1.7 km || 
|-id=759 bgcolor=#E9E9E9
| 19759 ||  || — || April 12, 2000 || Haleakala || NEAT || EUN || align=right | 6.2 km || 
|-id=760 bgcolor=#d6d6d6
| 19760 ||  || — || April 7, 2000 || Socorro || LINEAR || — || align=right | 11 km || 
|-id=761 bgcolor=#fefefe
| 19761 ||  || — || May 7, 2000 || Socorro || LINEAR || PHO || align=right | 5.4 km || 
|-id=762 bgcolor=#fefefe
| 19762 Lacrowder ||  ||  || May 6, 2000 || Socorro || LINEAR || — || align=right | 4.2 km || 
|-id=763 bgcolor=#fefefe
| 19763 Klimesh || 2000 MC ||  || June 18, 2000 || Haleakala || NEAT || slow || align=right | 7.3 km || 
|-id=764 bgcolor=#FFC2E0
| 19764 ||  || — || July 7, 2000 || Socorro || LINEAR || AMO +1km || align=right | 1.6 km || 
|-id=765 bgcolor=#fefefe
| 19765 ||  || — || July 10, 2000 || Valinhos || Valinhos Obs. || NYS || align=right | 2.6 km || 
|-id=766 bgcolor=#fefefe
| 19766 Katiedavis ||  ||  || July 24, 2000 || Socorro || LINEAR || V || align=right | 2.2 km || 
|-id=767 bgcolor=#E9E9E9
| 19767 ||  || — || July 24, 2000 || Socorro || LINEAR || — || align=right | 9.8 km || 
|-id=768 bgcolor=#fefefe
| 19768 Ellendoane ||  ||  || July 23, 2000 || Socorro || LINEAR || — || align=right | 3.3 km || 
|-id=769 bgcolor=#fefefe
| 19769 Dolyniuk ||  ||  || July 23, 2000 || Socorro || LINEAR || NYS || align=right | 3.5 km || 
|-id=770 bgcolor=#E9E9E9
| 19770 ||  || — || July 31, 2000 || Socorro || LINEAR || — || align=right | 3.6 km || 
|-id=771 bgcolor=#E9E9E9
| 19771 ||  || — || July 30, 2000 || Socorro || LINEAR || EUN || align=right | 6.8 km || 
|-id=772 bgcolor=#E9E9E9
| 19772 ||  || — || July 31, 2000 || Socorro || LINEAR || EUN || align=right | 3.5 km || 
|-id=773 bgcolor=#E9E9E9
| 19773 ||  || — || July 31, 2000 || Socorro || LINEAR || EUN || align=right | 6.3 km || 
|-id=774 bgcolor=#E9E9E9
| 19774 ||  || — || July 30, 2000 || Socorro || LINEAR || — || align=right | 13 km || 
|-id=775 bgcolor=#fefefe
| 19775 Medmondson || 2000 PY ||  || August 1, 2000 || Socorro || LINEAR || — || align=right | 3.5 km || 
|-id=776 bgcolor=#fefefe
| 19776 Balears ||  ||  || August 4, 2000 || Ametlla de Mar || J. Nomen || — || align=right | 3.6 km || 
|-id=777 bgcolor=#E9E9E9
| 19777 ||  || — || August 2, 2000 || Socorro || LINEAR || — || align=right | 4.7 km || 
|-id=778 bgcolor=#d6d6d6
| 19778 Louisgarcia ||  ||  || August 24, 2000 || Socorro || LINEAR || KOR || align=right | 3.4 km || 
|-id=779 bgcolor=#E9E9E9
| 19779 ||  || — || August 25, 2000 || Socorro || LINEAR || — || align=right | 4.5 km || 
|-id=780 bgcolor=#d6d6d6
| 19780 ||  || — || August 28, 2000 || Socorro || LINEAR || EOS || align=right | 5.9 km || 
|-id=781 bgcolor=#E9E9E9
| 19781 ||  || — || August 26, 2000 || Črni Vrh || Črni Vrh || — || align=right | 6.8 km || 
|-id=782 bgcolor=#d6d6d6
| 19782 ||  || — || August 30, 2000 || Višnjan Observatory || K. Korlević || — || align=right | 9.7 km || 
|-id=783 bgcolor=#d6d6d6
| 19783 Antoniromanya ||  ||  || August 27, 2000 || Ametlla de Mar || J. Nomen || THM || align=right | 13 km || 
|-id=784 bgcolor=#d6d6d6
| 19784 ||  || — || August 24, 2000 || Socorro || LINEAR || — || align=right | 5.4 km || 
|-id=785 bgcolor=#E9E9E9
| 19785 ||  || — || August 28, 2000 || Socorro || LINEAR || ADE || align=right | 7.6 km || 
|-id=786 bgcolor=#d6d6d6
| 19786 ||  || — || August 28, 2000 || Socorro || LINEAR || — || align=right | 6.4 km || 
|-id=787 bgcolor=#E9E9E9
| 19787 Betsyglass ||  ||  || August 24, 2000 || Socorro || LINEAR || — || align=right | 7.9 km || 
|-id=788 bgcolor=#E9E9E9
| 19788 Hunker ||  ||  || August 28, 2000 || Socorro || LINEAR || — || align=right | 8.8 km || 
|-id=789 bgcolor=#fefefe
| 19789 Susanjohnson ||  ||  || August 24, 2000 || Socorro || LINEAR || — || align=right | 3.1 km || 
|-id=790 bgcolor=#E9E9E9
| 19790 ||  || — || September 1, 2000 || Socorro || LINEAR || DOR || align=right | 9.1 km || 
|-id=791 bgcolor=#d6d6d6
| 19791 ||  || — || September 1, 2000 || Socorro || LINEAR || EOS || align=right | 7.4 km || 
|-id=792 bgcolor=#E9E9E9
| 19792 ||  || — || September 1, 2000 || Socorro || LINEAR || — || align=right | 8.9 km || 
|-id=793 bgcolor=#E9E9E9
| 19793 ||  || — || September 3, 2000 || Socorro || LINEAR || EUN || align=right | 8.5 km || 
|-id=794 bgcolor=#fefefe
| 19794 ||  || — || September 5, 2000 || Socorro || LINEAR || — || align=right | 5.4 km || 
|-id=795 bgcolor=#d6d6d6
| 19795 ||  || — || September 5, 2000 || Socorro || LINEAR || — || align=right | 9.6 km || 
|-id=796 bgcolor=#fefefe
| 19796 ||  || — || September 5, 2000 || Socorro || LINEAR || NYS || align=right | 2.5 km || 
|-id=797 bgcolor=#d6d6d6
| 19797 ||  || — || September 5, 2000 || Socorro || LINEAR || — || align=right | 11 km || 
|-id=798 bgcolor=#d6d6d6
| 19798 ||  || — || September 5, 2000 || Socorro || LINEAR || THM || align=right | 8.5 km || 
|-id=799 bgcolor=#E9E9E9
| 19799 ||  || — || September 5, 2000 || Socorro || LINEAR || — || align=right | 7.4 km || 
|-id=800 bgcolor=#d6d6d6
| 19800 ||  || — || September 5, 2000 || Socorro || LINEAR || THM || align=right | 8.9 km || 
|}

19801–19900 

|-bgcolor=#d6d6d6
| 19801 Karenlemmon ||  ||  || September 1, 2000 || Socorro || LINEAR || KOR || align=right | 4.1 km || 
|-id=802 bgcolor=#fefefe
| 19802 ||  || — || September 2, 2000 || Socorro || LINEAR || — || align=right | 2.4 km || 
|-id=803 bgcolor=#E9E9E9
| 19803 ||  || — || September 3, 2000 || Socorro || LINEAR || — || align=right | 3.5 km || 
|-id=804 bgcolor=#d6d6d6
| 19804 ||  || — || September 6, 2000 || Socorro || LINEAR || EOS || align=right | 7.0 km || 
|-id=805 bgcolor=#fefefe
| 19805 ||  || — || September 24, 2000 || Višnjan Observatory || K. Korlević || MAS || align=right | 2.3 km || 
|-id=806 bgcolor=#fefefe
| 19806 Domatthews ||  ||  || September 20, 2000 || Socorro || LINEAR || — || align=right | 2.2 km || 
|-id=807 bgcolor=#d6d6d6
| 19807 ||  || — || September 23, 2000 || Socorro || LINEAR || INA || align=right | 9.2 km || 
|-id=808 bgcolor=#E9E9E9
| 19808 Elainemccall ||  ||  || September 24, 2000 || Socorro || LINEAR || HEN || align=right | 4.4 km || 
|-id=809 bgcolor=#fefefe
| 19809 Nancyowen ||  ||  || September 24, 2000 || Socorro || LINEAR || V || align=right | 2.1 km || 
|-id=810 bgcolor=#d6d6d6
| 19810 Partridge ||  ||  || September 24, 2000 || Socorro || LINEAR || — || align=right | 9.4 km || 
|-id=811 bgcolor=#E9E9E9
| 19811 Kimperkins ||  ||  || September 24, 2000 || Socorro || LINEAR || — || align=right | 3.1 km || 
|-id=812 bgcolor=#d6d6d6
| 19812 ||  || — || September 24, 2000 || Socorro || LINEAR || — || align=right | 9.6 km || 
|-id=813 bgcolor=#fefefe
| 19813 Ericsands ||  ||  || September 24, 2000 || Socorro || LINEAR || V || align=right | 2.1 km || 
|-id=814 bgcolor=#fefefe
| 19814 ||  || — || September 24, 2000 || Socorro || LINEAR || — || align=right | 3.1 km || 
|-id=815 bgcolor=#E9E9E9
| 19815 Marshasega ||  ||  || September 24, 2000 || Socorro || LINEAR || — || align=right | 6.4 km || 
|-id=816 bgcolor=#fefefe
| 19816 Wayneseyfert ||  ||  || September 24, 2000 || Socorro || LINEAR || FLO || align=right | 2.1 km || 
|-id=817 bgcolor=#E9E9E9
| 19817 Larashelton ||  ||  || September 24, 2000 || Socorro || LINEAR || — || align=right | 4.4 km || 
|-id=818 bgcolor=#fefefe
| 19818 Shotwell ||  ||  || September 24, 2000 || Socorro || LINEAR || — || align=right | 3.8 km || 
|-id=819 bgcolor=#d6d6d6
| 19819 ||  || — || September 24, 2000 || Socorro || LINEAR || — || align=right | 11 km || 
|-id=820 bgcolor=#E9E9E9
| 19820 Stowers ||  ||  || September 24, 2000 || Socorro || LINEAR || GEF || align=right | 3.3 km || 
|-id=821 bgcolor=#d6d6d6
| 19821 Caroltolin ||  ||  || September 24, 2000 || Socorro || LINEAR || KOR || align=right | 5.6 km || 
|-id=822 bgcolor=#fefefe
| 19822 Vonzielonka ||  ||  || September 23, 2000 || Socorro || LINEAR || — || align=right | 2.7 km || 
|-id=823 bgcolor=#E9E9E9
| 19823 ||  || — || September 24, 2000 || Socorro || LINEAR || — || align=right | 4.5 km || 
|-id=824 bgcolor=#d6d6d6
| 19824 ||  || — || September 28, 2000 || Socorro || LINEAR || — || align=right | 5.8 km || 
|-id=825 bgcolor=#E9E9E9
| 19825 ||  || — || September 28, 2000 || Socorro || LINEAR || — || align=right | 5.2 km || 
|-id=826 bgcolor=#d6d6d6
| 19826 Patwalker ||  ||  || September 24, 2000 || Socorro || LINEAR || — || align=right | 8.3 km || 
|-id=827 bgcolor=#d6d6d6
| 19827 ||  || — || September 25, 2000 || Socorro || LINEAR || — || align=right | 8.6 km || 
|-id=828 bgcolor=#fefefe
| 19828 ||  || — || September 25, 2000 || Socorro || LINEAR || — || align=right | 8.5 km || 
|-id=829 bgcolor=#E9E9E9
| 19829 ||  || — || September 26, 2000 || Socorro || LINEAR || GEF || align=right | 6.3 km || 
|-id=830 bgcolor=#fefefe
| 19830 ||  || — || September 26, 2000 || Socorro || LINEAR || FLO || align=right | 3.8 km || 
|-id=831 bgcolor=#E9E9E9
| 19831 ||  || — || September 27, 2000 || Socorro || LINEAR || — || align=right | 4.8 km || 
|-id=832 bgcolor=#E9E9E9
| 19832 ||  || — || September 27, 2000 || Socorro || LINEAR || — || align=right | 4.4 km || 
|-id=833 bgcolor=#d6d6d6
| 19833 Wickwar ||  ||  || September 28, 2000 || Socorro || LINEAR || KOR || align=right | 3.5 km || 
|-id=834 bgcolor=#E9E9E9
| 19834 ||  || — || September 26, 2000 || Socorro || LINEAR || GEF || align=right | 5.3 km || 
|-id=835 bgcolor=#fefefe
| 19835 Zreda ||  ||  || September 24, 2000 || Socorro || LINEAR || — || align=right | 2.5 km || 
|-id=836 bgcolor=#d6d6d6
| 19836 ||  || — || September 27, 2000 || Socorro || LINEAR || — || align=right | 10 km || 
|-id=837 bgcolor=#E9E9E9
| 19837 ||  || — || September 27, 2000 || Socorro || LINEAR || — || align=right | 2.7 km || 
|-id=838 bgcolor=#fefefe
| 19838 ||  || — || September 28, 2000 || Socorro || LINEAR || — || align=right | 4.5 km || 
|-id=839 bgcolor=#fefefe
| 19839 ||  || — || September 28, 2000 || Socorro || LINEAR || FLO || align=right | 1.9 km || 
|-id=840 bgcolor=#fefefe
| 19840 ||  || — || September 27, 2000 || Socorro || LINEAR || — || align=right | 4.4 km || 
|-id=841 bgcolor=#E9E9E9
| 19841 ||  || — || September 30, 2000 || Socorro || LINEAR || — || align=right | 3.8 km || 
|-id=842 bgcolor=#E9E9E9
| 19842 ||  || — || September 28, 2000 || Socorro || LINEAR || DOR || align=right | 7.5 km || 
|-id=843 bgcolor=#fefefe
| 19843 ||  || — || September 30, 2000 || Socorro || LINEAR || — || align=right | 2.2 km || 
|-id=844 bgcolor=#C2FFFF
| 19844 ||  || — || September 30, 2000 || Socorro || LINEAR || L5 || align=right | 38 km || 
|-id=845 bgcolor=#d6d6d6
| 19845 ||  || — || September 27, 2000 || Socorro || LINEAR || VER || align=right | 14 km || 
|-id=846 bgcolor=#fefefe
| 19846 ||  || — || September 30, 2000 || Socorro || LINEAR || — || align=right | 4.8 km || 
|-id=847 bgcolor=#fefefe
| 19847 ||  || — || September 25, 2000 || Kitt Peak || Spacewatch || — || align=right | 8.5 km || 
|-id=848 bgcolor=#d6d6d6
| 19848 Yeungchuchiu || 2000 TR ||  || October 2, 2000 || Desert Beaver || W. K. Y. Yeung || EOS || align=right | 13 km || 
|-id=849 bgcolor=#d6d6d6
| 19849 ||  || — || October 1, 2000 || Socorro || LINEAR || KOR || align=right | 4.0 km || 
|-id=850 bgcolor=#E9E9E9
| 19850 ||  || — || October 2, 2000 || Socorro || LINEAR || EUN || align=right | 3.9 km || 
|-id=851 bgcolor=#d6d6d6
| 19851 ||  || — || October 1, 2000 || Socorro || LINEAR || EOS || align=right | 7.1 km || 
|-id=852 bgcolor=#d6d6d6
| 19852 Jamesalbers ||  ||  || October 2, 2000 || Anderson Mesa || LONEOS || — || align=right | 15 km || 
|-id=853 bgcolor=#d6d6d6
| 19853 Ichinomiya ||  ||  || October 2, 2000 || Anderson Mesa || LONEOS || — || align=right | 12 km || 
|-id=854 bgcolor=#d6d6d6
| 19854 ||  || — || October 19, 2000 || Kitt Peak || Spacewatch || KOR || align=right | 3.4 km || 
|-id=855 bgcolor=#d6d6d6
| 19855 Borisalexeev ||  ||  || October 24, 2000 || Socorro || LINEAR || EOS || align=right | 4.6 km || 
|-id=856 bgcolor=#E9E9E9
| 19856 ||  || — || October 24, 2000 || Socorro || LINEAR || — || align=right | 4.5 km || 
|-id=857 bgcolor=#fefefe
| 19857 Amandajane ||  ||  || October 19, 2000 || Olathe || L. Robinson || — || align=right | 3.0 km || 
|-id=858 bgcolor=#d6d6d6
| 19858 ||  || — || October 25, 2000 || Socorro || LINEAR || — || align=right | 13 km || 
|-id=859 bgcolor=#d6d6d6
| 19859 ||  || — || October 24, 2000 || Socorro || LINEAR || — || align=right | 7.4 km || 
|-id=860 bgcolor=#d6d6d6
| 19860 Anahtar ||  ||  || October 24, 2000 || Socorro || LINEAR || — || align=right | 7.7 km || 
|-id=861 bgcolor=#E9E9E9
| 19861 Auster ||  ||  || October 24, 2000 || Socorro || LINEAR || — || align=right | 4.7 km || 
|-id=862 bgcolor=#d6d6d6
| 19862 || 2556 P-L || — || September 24, 1960 || Palomar || PLS || LIX || align=right | 13 km || 
|-id=863 bgcolor=#E9E9E9
| 19863 || 2725 P-L || — || September 24, 1960 || Palomar || PLS || — || align=right | 3.6 km || 
|-id=864 bgcolor=#fefefe
| 19864 || 2775 P-L || — || September 24, 1960 || Palomar || PLS || NYS || align=right | 2.1 km || 
|-id=865 bgcolor=#d6d6d6
| 19865 || 2825 P-L || — || September 24, 1960 || Palomar || PLS || — || align=right | 7.2 km || 
|-id=866 bgcolor=#fefefe
| 19866 || 4014 P-L || — || September 24, 1960 || Palomar || PLS || FLO || align=right | 2.6 km || 
|-id=867 bgcolor=#d6d6d6
| 19867 || 4061 P-L || — || September 24, 1960 || Palomar || PLS || HYG || align=right | 8.5 km || 
|-id=868 bgcolor=#fefefe
| 19868 || 4072 P-L || — || September 24, 1960 || Palomar || PLS || — || align=right | 2.7 km || 
|-id=869 bgcolor=#E9E9E9
| 19869 || 4202 P-L || — || September 24, 1960 || Palomar || PLS || — || align=right | 3.9 km || 
|-id=870 bgcolor=#d6d6d6
| 19870 || 4780 P-L || — || September 24, 1960 || Palomar || PLS || HYG || align=right | 10 km || 
|-id=871 bgcolor=#E9E9E9
| 19871 || 6058 P-L || — || September 24, 1960 || Palomar || PLS || — || align=right | 2.9 km || 
|-id=872 bgcolor=#fefefe
| 19872 Chendonghua || 6097 P-L ||  || September 24, 1960 || Palomar || PLS || NYS || align=right | 2.5 km || 
|-id=873 bgcolor=#d6d6d6
| 19873 Chentao || 6632 P-L ||  || September 24, 1960 || Palomar || PLS || KOR || align=right | 5.0 km || 
|-id=874 bgcolor=#fefefe
| 19874 Liudongyan || 6775 P-L ||  || September 24, 1960 || Palomar || PLS || — || align=right | 1.5 km || 
|-id=875 bgcolor=#E9E9E9
| 19875 Guedes || 6791 P-L ||  || September 24, 1960 || Palomar || PLS || — || align=right | 4.0 km || 
|-id=876 bgcolor=#fefefe
| 19876 || 7637 P-L || — || October 22, 1960 || Palomar || PLS || ERI || align=right | 3.7 km || 
|-id=877 bgcolor=#FA8072
| 19877 || 9086 P-L || — || October 17, 1960 || Palomar || PLS || — || align=right | 1.3 km || 
|-id=878 bgcolor=#fefefe
| 19878 || 1030 T-1 || — || March 25, 1971 || Palomar || PLS || — || align=right | 3.4 km || 
|-id=879 bgcolor=#E9E9E9
| 19879 || 1274 T-1 || — || March 25, 1971 || Palomar || PLS || — || align=right | 12 km || 
|-id=880 bgcolor=#d6d6d6
| 19880 || 2247 T-1 || — || March 25, 1971 || Palomar || PLS || — || align=right | 7.3 km || 
|-id=881 bgcolor=#E9E9E9
| 19881 || 2288 T-1 || — || March 25, 1971 || Palomar || PLS || — || align=right | 4.2 km || 
|-id=882 bgcolor=#fefefe
| 19882 || 3024 T-1 || — || March 26, 1971 || Palomar || PLS || — || align=right | 2.9 km || 
|-id=883 bgcolor=#fefefe
| 19883 || 4058 T-1 || — || March 26, 1971 || Palomar || PLS || — || align=right | 2.9 km || 
|-id=884 bgcolor=#fefefe
| 19884 || 4125 T-1 || — || March 26, 1971 || Palomar || PLS || — || align=right | 2.3 km || 
|-id=885 bgcolor=#fefefe
| 19885 || 4283 T-1 || — || March 26, 1971 || Palomar || PLS || — || align=right | 3.7 km || 
|-id=886 bgcolor=#E9E9E9
| 19886 || 1167 T-2 || — || September 29, 1973 || Palomar || PLS || — || align=right | 3.5 km || 
|-id=887 bgcolor=#fefefe
| 19887 || 1279 T-2 || — || September 29, 1973 || Palomar || PLS || — || align=right | 2.3 km || 
|-id=888 bgcolor=#d6d6d6
| 19888 || 2048 T-2 || — || September 29, 1973 || Palomar || PLS || EOS || align=right | 5.8 km || 
|-id=889 bgcolor=#d6d6d6
| 19889 || 2304 T-2 || — || September 29, 1973 || Palomar || PLS || — || align=right | 3.7 km || 
|-id=890 bgcolor=#fefefe
| 19890 || 3042 T-2 || — || September 30, 1973 || Palomar || PLS || — || align=right | 2.3 km || 
|-id=891 bgcolor=#E9E9E9
| 19891 || 3326 T-2 || — || September 25, 1973 || Palomar || PLS || XIZ || align=right | 3.9 km || 
|-id=892 bgcolor=#fefefe
| 19892 || 4128 T-2 || — || September 29, 1973 || Palomar || PLS || NYS || align=right | 1.3 km || 
|-id=893 bgcolor=#d6d6d6
| 19893 || 4524 T-2 || — || September 30, 1973 || Palomar || PLS || — || align=right | 7.4 km || 
|-id=894 bgcolor=#E9E9E9
| 19894 || 5124 T-2 || — || September 25, 1973 || Palomar || PLS || EUN || align=right | 5.3 km || 
|-id=895 bgcolor=#E9E9E9
| 19895 || 5161 T-2 || — || September 25, 1973 || Palomar || PLS || EUN || align=right | 5.0 km || 
|-id=896 bgcolor=#d6d6d6
| 19896 || 5366 T-2 || — || September 30, 1973 || Palomar || PLS || — || align=right | 4.8 km || 
|-id=897 bgcolor=#E9E9E9
| 19897 || 1097 T-3 || — || October 17, 1977 || Palomar || PLS || GEF || align=right | 4.0 km || 
|-id=898 bgcolor=#d6d6d6
| 19898 || 1177 T-3 || — || October 17, 1977 || Palomar || PLS || — || align=right | 8.9 km || 
|-id=899 bgcolor=#fefefe
| 19899 || 1188 T-3 || — || October 17, 1977 || Palomar || PLS || — || align=right | 2.3 km || 
|-id=900 bgcolor=#d6d6d6
| 19900 || 2172 T-3 || — || October 16, 1977 || Palomar || PLS || — || align=right | 7.6 km || 
|}

19901–20000 

|-bgcolor=#E9E9E9
| 19901 || 2191 T-3 || — || October 16, 1977 || Palomar || PLS || — || align=right | 4.6 km || 
|-id=902 bgcolor=#fefefe
| 19902 || 3420 T-3 || — || October 16, 1977 || Palomar || PLS || NYS || align=right | 2.5 km || 
|-id=903 bgcolor=#fefefe
| 19903 || 3464 T-3 || — || October 16, 1977 || Palomar || PLS || NYS || align=right | 1.4 km || 
|-id=904 bgcolor=#E9E9E9
| 19904 || 3487 T-3 || — || October 16, 1977 || Palomar || PLS || — || align=right | 4.3 km || 
|-id=905 bgcolor=#fefefe
| 19905 || 4086 T-3 || — || October 16, 1977 || Palomar || PLS || — || align=right | 1.6 km || 
|-id=906 bgcolor=#d6d6d6
| 19906 || 4138 T-3 || — || October 16, 1977 || Palomar || PLS || — || align=right | 12 km || 
|-id=907 bgcolor=#d6d6d6
| 19907 || 4220 T-3 || — || October 16, 1977 || Palomar || PLS || ALA || align=right | 12 km || 
|-id=908 bgcolor=#E9E9E9
| 19908 || 4324 T-3 || — || October 16, 1977 || Palomar || PLS || — || align=right | 7.5 km || 
|-id=909 bgcolor=#fefefe
| 19909 || 4326 T-3 || — || October 16, 1977 || Palomar || PLS || — || align=right | 3.0 km || 
|-id=910 bgcolor=#d6d6d6
| 19910 || 5078 T-3 || — || October 16, 1977 || Palomar || PLS || EOS || align=right | 16 km || 
|-id=911 bgcolor=#d6d6d6
| 19911 Rigaux || 1933 FK ||  || March 26, 1933 || Uccle || F. Rigaux || — || align=right | 18 km || 
|-id=912 bgcolor=#fefefe
| 19912 Aurapenenta ||  ||  || September 14, 1955 || Brooklyn || Indiana University || — || align=right | 4.1 km || 
|-id=913 bgcolor=#C2FFFF
| 19913 Aigyptios ||  ||  || September 19, 1973 || Palomar || PLS || L4 || align=right | 25 km || 
|-id=914 bgcolor=#fefefe
| 19914 Klagenfurt ||  ||  || October 27, 1973 || Tautenburg Observatory || F. Börngen || NYS || align=right | 6.1 km || 
|-id=915 bgcolor=#fefefe
| 19915 Bochkarev ||  ||  || September 14, 1974 || Nauchnij || N. S. Chernykh || — || align=right | 2.3 km || 
|-id=916 bgcolor=#fefefe
| 19916 Donbass ||  ||  || August 26, 1976 || Nauchnij || N. S. Chernykh || — || align=right | 3.6 km || 
|-id=917 bgcolor=#d6d6d6
| 19917 Dazaifu ||  ||  || March 12, 1977 || Kiso || H. Kosai, K. Furukawa || 7:4 || align=right | 12 km || 
|-id=918 bgcolor=#E9E9E9
| 19918 Stavby || 1977 PB ||  || August 6, 1977 || Mount Stromlo || C.-I. Lagerkvist || EUN || align=right | 7.5 km || 
|-id=919 bgcolor=#E9E9E9
| 19919 Pogorelov ||  ||  || October 8, 1977 || Nauchnij || L. I. Chernykh || EUN || align=right | 5.9 km || 
|-id=920 bgcolor=#E9E9E9
| 19920 || 1978 NF || — || July 10, 1978 || Palomar || E. F. Helin, E. M. Shoemaker || EUN || align=right | 3.4 km || 
|-id=921 bgcolor=#d6d6d6
| 19921 ||  || — || November 7, 1978 || Palomar || E. F. Helin, S. J. Bus || — || align=right | 13 km || 
|-id=922 bgcolor=#E9E9E9
| 19922 ||  || — || November 7, 1978 || Palomar || E. F. Helin, S. J. Bus || — || align=right | 3.3 km || 
|-id=923 bgcolor=#d6d6d6
| 19923 ||  || — || November 6, 1978 || Palomar || E. F. Helin, S. J. Bus || THM || align=right | 8.1 km || 
|-id=924 bgcolor=#fefefe
| 19924 ||  || — || June 25, 1979 || Siding Spring || E. F. Helin, S. J. Bus || FLO || align=right | 2.2 km || 
|-id=925 bgcolor=#fefefe
| 19925 ||  || — || August 22, 1979 || La Silla || C.-I. Lagerkvist || FLO || align=right | 1.7 km || 
|-id=926 bgcolor=#E9E9E9
| 19926 || 1979 YQ || — || December 17, 1979 || La Silla || H. Debehogne, E. R. Netto || — || align=right | 12 km || 
|-id=927 bgcolor=#d6d6d6
| 19927 Rogefeldt ||  ||  || March 16, 1980 || La Silla || C.-I. Lagerkvist || EOS || align=right | 6.7 km || 
|-id=928 bgcolor=#E9E9E9
| 19928 ||  || — || February 28, 1981 || Siding Spring || S. J. Bus || — || align=right | 5.6 km || 
|-id=929 bgcolor=#fefefe
| 19929 ||  || — || February 28, 1981 || Siding Spring || S. J. Bus || V || align=right | 2.1 km || 
|-id=930 bgcolor=#d6d6d6
| 19930 ||  || — || March 2, 1981 || Siding Spring || S. J. Bus || — || align=right | 9.4 km || 
|-id=931 bgcolor=#fefefe
| 19931 ||  || — || March 2, 1981 || Siding Spring || S. J. Bus || V || align=right | 1.5 km || 
|-id=932 bgcolor=#d6d6d6
| 19932 ||  || — || March 2, 1981 || Siding Spring || S. J. Bus || EOS || align=right | 11 km || 
|-id=933 bgcolor=#E9E9E9
| 19933 ||  || — || March 7, 1981 || Siding Spring || S. J. Bus || EUN || align=right | 9.5 km || 
|-id=934 bgcolor=#E9E9E9
| 19934 ||  || — || March 1, 1981 || Siding Spring || S. J. Bus || — || align=right | 2.3 km || 
|-id=935 bgcolor=#E9E9E9
| 19935 ||  || — || March 1, 1981 || Siding Spring || S. J. Bus || RAF || align=right | 3.1 km || 
|-id=936 bgcolor=#fefefe
| 19936 ||  || — || March 1, 1981 || Siding Spring || S. J. Bus || FLO || align=right | 2.5 km || 
|-id=937 bgcolor=#d6d6d6
| 19937 ||  || — || March 1, 1981 || Siding Spring || S. J. Bus || EOS || align=right | 3.8 km || 
|-id=938 bgcolor=#fefefe
| 19938 ||  || — || March 1, 1981 || Siding Spring || S. J. Bus || NYS || align=right | 2.1 km || 
|-id=939 bgcolor=#E9E9E9
| 19939 ||  || — || March 1, 1981 || Siding Spring || S. J. Bus || — || align=right | 3.5 km || 
|-id=940 bgcolor=#E9E9E9
| 19940 ||  || — || March 2, 1981 || Siding Spring || S. J. Bus || ADE || align=right | 6.4 km || 
|-id=941 bgcolor=#fefefe
| 19941 ||  || — || March 2, 1981 || Siding Spring || S. J. Bus || V || align=right | 1.5 km || 
|-id=942 bgcolor=#E9E9E9
| 19942 ||  || — || March 2, 1981 || Siding Spring || S. J. Bus || — || align=right | 5.0 km || 
|-id=943 bgcolor=#d6d6d6
| 19943 ||  || — || March 2, 1981 || Siding Spring || S. J. Bus || — || align=right | 7.2 km || 
|-id=944 bgcolor=#fefefe
| 19944 ||  || — || March 2, 1981 || Siding Spring || S. J. Bus || — || align=right | 2.4 km || 
|-id=945 bgcolor=#d6d6d6
| 19945 ||  || — || March 2, 1981 || Siding Spring || S. J. Bus || — || align=right | 8.3 km || 
|-id=946 bgcolor=#fefefe
| 19946 ||  || — || March 2, 1981 || Siding Spring || S. J. Bus || — || align=right | 2.7 km || 
|-id=947 bgcolor=#d6d6d6
| 19947 ||  || — || March 2, 1981 || Siding Spring || S. J. Bus || — || align=right | 6.0 km || 
|-id=948 bgcolor=#fefefe
| 19948 ||  || — || March 2, 1981 || Siding Spring || S. J. Bus || — || align=right | 2.8 km || 
|-id=949 bgcolor=#fefefe
| 19949 ||  || — || March 2, 1981 || Siding Spring || S. J. Bus || — || align=right | 2.0 km || 
|-id=950 bgcolor=#d6d6d6
| 19950 ||  || — || March 2, 1981 || Siding Spring || S. J. Bus || — || align=right | 5.1 km || 
|-id=951 bgcolor=#d6d6d6
| 19951 ||  || — || October 20, 1982 || Kitt Peak || G. Aldering || — || align=right | 9.4 km || 
|-id=952 bgcolor=#E9E9E9
| 19952 Ashkinazi ||  ||  || October 20, 1982 || Nauchnij || L. G. Karachkina || — || align=right | 5.8 km || 
|-id=953 bgcolor=#E9E9E9
| 19953 Takeo ||  ||  || November 14, 1982 || Kiso || H. Kosai, K. Furukawa || EUN || align=right | 6.6 km || 
|-id=954 bgcolor=#fefefe
| 19954 Shigeyoshi ||  ||  || November 14, 1982 || Kiso || H. Kosai, K. Furukawa || FLO || align=right | 3.6 km || 
|-id=955 bgcolor=#d6d6d6
| 19955 Hollý ||  ||  || November 28, 1984 || Piszkéstető || M. Antal || — || align=right | 7.8 km || 
|-id=956 bgcolor=#fefefe
| 19956 ||  || — || August 17, 1985 || Palomar || E. F. Helin || — || align=right | 2.7 km || 
|-id=957 bgcolor=#fefefe
| 19957 ||  || — || August 24, 1985 || Smolyan || Bulgarian National Obs. || — || align=right | 2.3 km || 
|-id=958 bgcolor=#FA8072
| 19958 ||  || — || September 11, 1985 || La Silla || H. Debehogne || — || align=right | 1.8 km || 
|-id=959 bgcolor=#fefefe
| 19959 ||  || — || October 17, 1985 || Kvistaberg || C.-I. Lagerkvist || — || align=right | 3.7 km || 
|-id=960 bgcolor=#fefefe
| 19960 ||  || — || February 3, 1986 || La Silla || H. Debehogne || — || align=right | 4.6 km || 
|-id=961 bgcolor=#fefefe
| 19961 ||  || — || August 29, 1986 || La Silla || H. Debehogne || — || align=right | 3.0 km || 
|-id=962 bgcolor=#fefefe
| 19962 Martynenko ||  ||  || September 7, 1986 || Nauchnij || L. I. Chernykh || FLO || align=right | 2.2 km || 
|-id=963 bgcolor=#E9E9E9
| 19963 || 1986 TR || — || October 4, 1986 || Brorfelde || P. Jensen || — || align=right | 5.5 km || 
|-id=964 bgcolor=#E9E9E9
| 19964 ||  || — || January 25, 1987 || La Silla || E. W. Elst || DOR || align=right | 11 km || 
|-id=965 bgcolor=#d6d6d6
| 19965 ||  || — || September 14, 1987 || La Silla || H. Debehogne || — || align=right | 14 km || 
|-id=966 bgcolor=#d6d6d6
| 19966 ||  || — || September 25, 1987 || Brorfelde || P. Jensen || — || align=right | 8.7 km || 
|-id=967 bgcolor=#E9E9E9
| 19967 ||  || — || September 16, 1987 || La Silla || H. Debehogne || — || align=right | 4.0 km || 
|-id=968 bgcolor=#E9E9E9
| 19968 Palazzolascaris ||  ||  || March 19, 1988 || La Silla || W. Ferreri || — || align=right | 11 km || 
|-id=969 bgcolor=#fefefe
| 19969 Davidfreedman || 1988 PR ||  || August 11, 1988 || Siding Spring || A. J. Noymer || — || align=right | 2.8 km || 
|-id=970 bgcolor=#fefefe
| 19970 Johannpeter ||  ||  || September 8, 1988 || Tautenburg Observatory || F. Börngen || NYS || align=right | 7.3 km || 
|-id=971 bgcolor=#fefefe
| 19971 ||  || — || September 3, 1988 || La Silla || H. Debehogne || — || align=right | 3.3 km || 
|-id=972 bgcolor=#fefefe
| 19972 ||  || — || September 5, 1988 || La Silla || H. Debehogne || MAS || align=right | 2.8 km || 
|-id=973 bgcolor=#d6d6d6
| 19973 ||  || — || September 14, 1988 || Cerro Tololo || S. J. Bus || — || align=right | 9.0 km || 
|-id=974 bgcolor=#E9E9E9
| 19974 ||  || — || April 3, 1989 || La Silla || E. W. Elst || MAR || align=right | 3.7 km || 
|-id=975 bgcolor=#fefefe
| 19975 ||  || — || April 3, 1989 || La Silla || E. W. Elst || — || align=right | 3.7 km || 
|-id=976 bgcolor=#fefefe
| 19976 || 1989 TD || — || October 4, 1989 || Chions || J. M. Baur || — || align=right | 2.0 km || 
|-id=977 bgcolor=#fefefe
| 19977 || 1989 TQ || — || October 7, 1989 || Kani || Y. Mizuno, T. Furuta || FLO || align=right | 4.3 km || 
|-id=978 bgcolor=#fefefe
| 19978 ||  || — || October 7, 1989 || La Silla || E. W. Elst || — || align=right | 2.4 km || 
|-id=979 bgcolor=#fefefe
| 19979 || 1989 VJ || — || November 2, 1989 || Yorii || M. Arai, H. Mori || V || align=right | 5.5 km || 
|-id=980 bgcolor=#fefefe
| 19980 Barrysimon ||  ||  || November 22, 1989 || Palomar || C. S. Shoemaker, D. H. Levy || PHO || align=right | 3.6 km || 
|-id=981 bgcolor=#d6d6d6
| 19981 Bialystock ||  ||  || December 29, 1989 || Haute Provence || E. W. Elst || THB || align=right | 12 km || 
|-id=982 bgcolor=#fefefe
| 19982 Barbaradoore || 1990 BJ ||  || January 22, 1990 || Palomar || E. F. Helin || PHO || align=right | 4.7 km || 
|-id=983 bgcolor=#fefefe
| 19983 Inagekiyokazu || 1990 DW ||  || February 18, 1990 || Kushiro || M. Matsuyama, K. Watanabe || — || align=right | 4.4 km || 
|-id=984 bgcolor=#fefefe
| 19984 ||  || — || March 2, 1990 || La Silla || E. W. Elst || — || align=right | 2.9 km || 
|-id=985 bgcolor=#fefefe
| 19985 || 1990 GD || — || April 15, 1990 || La Silla || E. W. Elst || — || align=right | 3.5 km || 
|-id=986 bgcolor=#E9E9E9
| 19986 || 1990 KD || — || May 20, 1990 || Siding Spring || R. H. McNaught || MIT || align=right | 7.5 km || 
|-id=987 bgcolor=#d6d6d6
| 19987 ||  || — || August 28, 1990 || Palomar || H. E. Holt || — || align=right | 6.1 km || 
|-id=988 bgcolor=#fefefe
| 19988 ||  || — || August 22, 1990 || Palomar || H. E. Holt || — || align=right | 2.0 km || 
|-id=989 bgcolor=#E9E9E9
| 19989 ||  || — || September 15, 1990 || La Silla || H. Debehogne || HEN || align=right | 3.6 km || 
|-id=990 bgcolor=#E9E9E9
| 19990 ||  || — || September 22, 1990 || La Silla || E. W. Elst || AGN || align=right | 3.0 km || 
|-id=991 bgcolor=#E9E9E9
| 19991 ||  || — || September 22, 1990 || La Silla || E. W. Elst || — || align=right | 4.5 km || 
|-id=992 bgcolor=#E9E9E9
| 19992 Schönbein ||  ||  || October 10, 1990 || Tautenburg Observatory || F. Börngen, L. D. Schmadel || — || align=right | 9.0 km || 
|-id=993 bgcolor=#E9E9E9
| 19993 Günterseeber ||  ||  || October 10, 1990 || Tautenburg Observatory || L. D. Schmadel, F. Börngen || — || align=right | 3.1 km || 
|-id=994 bgcolor=#E9E9E9
| 19994 Tresini ||  ||  || October 13, 1990 || Nauchnij || L. G. Karachkina, G. R. Kastelʹ || GEF || align=right | 5.2 km || 
|-id=995 bgcolor=#E9E9E9
| 19995 ||  || — || November 12, 1990 || La Silla || E. W. Elst || GEF || align=right | 5.8 km || 
|-id=996 bgcolor=#E9E9E9
| 19996 || 1990 WZ || — || November 18, 1990 || La Silla || E. W. Elst || — || align=right | 9.4 km || 
|-id=997 bgcolor=#d6d6d6
| 19997 ||  || — || November 18, 1990 || La Silla || E. W. Elst || — || align=right | 3.7 km || 
|-id=998 bgcolor=#E9E9E9
| 19998 Binoche ||  ||  || November 18, 1990 || La Silla || E. W. Elst || GEF || align=right | 4.1 km || 
|-id=999 bgcolor=#fefefe
| 19999 Depardieu ||  ||  || January 18, 1991 || Haute Provence || E. W. Elst || — || align=right | 3.6 km || 
|-id=000 bgcolor=#C2E0FF
| 20000 Varuna ||  ||  || November 28, 2000 || Kitt Peak || Spacewatch || other TNO || align=right | 900 km || 
|}

References

External links 
 Discovery Circumstances: Numbered Minor Planets (15001)–(20000) (IAU Minor Planet Center)

0019